

319001–319100 

|-bgcolor=#d6d6d6
| 319001 ||  || — || October 24, 2005 || Kitt Peak || Spacewatch || THM || align=right | 1.6 km || 
|-id=002 bgcolor=#E9E9E9
| 319002 ||  || — || October 29, 2005 || Mount Lemmon || Mount Lemmon Survey || — || align=right | 2.4 km || 
|-id=003 bgcolor=#E9E9E9
| 319003 ||  || — || October 30, 2005 || Socorro || LINEAR || MAR || align=right | 1.8 km || 
|-id=004 bgcolor=#E9E9E9
| 319004 ||  || — || October 23, 2005 || Palomar || NEAT || — || align=right | 3.0 km || 
|-id=005 bgcolor=#d6d6d6
| 319005 ||  || — || October 27, 2005 || Kitt Peak || Spacewatch || KOR || align=right | 1.6 km || 
|-id=006 bgcolor=#E9E9E9
| 319006 ||  || — || October 27, 2005 || Mount Lemmon || Mount Lemmon Survey || — || align=right | 2.8 km || 
|-id=007 bgcolor=#fefefe
| 319007 ||  || — || October 30, 2005 || Catalina || CSS || H || align=right data-sort-value="0.84" | 840 m || 
|-id=008 bgcolor=#fefefe
| 319008 ||  || — || October 22, 2005 || Catalina || CSS || H || align=right data-sort-value="0.69" | 690 m || 
|-id=009 bgcolor=#E9E9E9
| 319009 Kudirka ||  ||  || October 10, 2005 || Moletai || K. Černis, J. Zdanavičius || HOF || align=right | 3.1 km || 
|-id=010 bgcolor=#E9E9E9
| 319010 ||  || — || October 23, 2005 || Catalina || CSS || MAR || align=right | 1.5 km || 
|-id=011 bgcolor=#d6d6d6
| 319011 ||  || — || October 24, 2005 || Palomar || NEAT || — || align=right | 3.2 km || 
|-id=012 bgcolor=#d6d6d6
| 319012 ||  || — || October 27, 2005 || Socorro || LINEAR || — || align=right | 2.9 km || 
|-id=013 bgcolor=#E9E9E9
| 319013 ||  || — || October 27, 2005 || Socorro || LINEAR || HNS || align=right | 1.7 km || 
|-id=014 bgcolor=#E9E9E9
| 319014 ||  || — || October 27, 2005 || Palomar || NEAT || — || align=right | 2.1 km || 
|-id=015 bgcolor=#d6d6d6
| 319015 ||  || — || October 23, 2005 || Catalina || CSS || — || align=right | 2.5 km || 
|-id=016 bgcolor=#d6d6d6
| 319016 ||  || — || October 29, 2005 || Catalina || CSS || — || align=right | 4.5 km || 
|-id=017 bgcolor=#d6d6d6
| 319017 ||  || — || October 28, 2005 || Mount Lemmon || Mount Lemmon Survey || — || align=right | 3.7 km || 
|-id=018 bgcolor=#d6d6d6
| 319018 ||  || — || October 28, 2005 || Mount Lemmon || Mount Lemmon Survey || — || align=right | 4.2 km || 
|-id=019 bgcolor=#E9E9E9
| 319019 ||  || — || October 26, 2005 || Apache Point || A. C. Becker || MRX || align=right | 1.1 km || 
|-id=020 bgcolor=#d6d6d6
| 319020 ||  || — || October 27, 2005 || Kitt Peak || Spacewatch || — || align=right | 3.1 km || 
|-id=021 bgcolor=#fefefe
| 319021 ||  || — || November 3, 2005 || Socorro || LINEAR || H || align=right data-sort-value="0.82" | 820 m || 
|-id=022 bgcolor=#E9E9E9
| 319022 ||  || — || November 5, 2005 || Kitt Peak || Spacewatch || — || align=right | 2.5 km || 
|-id=023 bgcolor=#d6d6d6
| 319023 ||  || — || November 8, 2005 || Piszkéstető || K. Sárneczky || — || align=right | 2.3 km || 
|-id=024 bgcolor=#fefefe
| 319024 ||  || — || November 11, 2005 || Socorro || LINEAR || H || align=right | 1.0 km || 
|-id=025 bgcolor=#d6d6d6
| 319025 ||  || — || November 3, 2005 || Mount Lemmon || Mount Lemmon Survey || — || align=right | 2.9 km || 
|-id=026 bgcolor=#d6d6d6
| 319026 ||  || — || November 1, 2005 || Kitt Peak || Spacewatch || KOR || align=right | 1.3 km || 
|-id=027 bgcolor=#d6d6d6
| 319027 ||  || — || November 1, 2005 || Kitt Peak || Spacewatch || — || align=right | 2.0 km || 
|-id=028 bgcolor=#E9E9E9
| 319028 ||  || — || November 1, 2005 || Kitt Peak || Spacewatch || MRX || align=right | 1.3 km || 
|-id=029 bgcolor=#d6d6d6
| 319029 ||  || — || November 2, 2005 || Socorro || LINEAR || CHA || align=right | 2.4 km || 
|-id=030 bgcolor=#E9E9E9
| 319030 ||  || — || October 11, 2005 || Kitt Peak || Spacewatch || — || align=right | 2.6 km || 
|-id=031 bgcolor=#E9E9E9
| 319031 ||  || — || November 4, 2005 || Catalina || CSS || — || align=right | 1.9 km || 
|-id=032 bgcolor=#E9E9E9
| 319032 ||  || — || November 4, 2005 || Mount Lemmon || Mount Lemmon Survey || WIT || align=right | 1.4 km || 
|-id=033 bgcolor=#E9E9E9
| 319033 ||  || — || November 3, 2005 || Mount Lemmon || Mount Lemmon Survey || — || align=right | 1.8 km || 
|-id=034 bgcolor=#fefefe
| 319034 ||  || — || November 2, 2005 || Mount Lemmon || Mount Lemmon Survey || — || align=right | 1.1 km || 
|-id=035 bgcolor=#d6d6d6
| 319035 ||  || — || November 3, 2005 || Catalina || CSS || — || align=right | 3.1 km || 
|-id=036 bgcolor=#E9E9E9
| 319036 ||  || — || November 5, 2005 || Catalina || CSS || — || align=right | 2.6 km || 
|-id=037 bgcolor=#E9E9E9
| 319037 ||  || — || November 1, 2005 || Mount Lemmon || Mount Lemmon Survey || HEN || align=right | 1.2 km || 
|-id=038 bgcolor=#d6d6d6
| 319038 ||  || — || November 1, 2005 || Mount Lemmon || Mount Lemmon Survey || — || align=right | 2.1 km || 
|-id=039 bgcolor=#d6d6d6
| 319039 ||  || — || November 1, 2005 || Mount Lemmon || Mount Lemmon Survey || — || align=right | 2.9 km || 
|-id=040 bgcolor=#d6d6d6
| 319040 ||  || — || November 1, 2005 || Mount Lemmon || Mount Lemmon Survey || — || align=right | 2.0 km || 
|-id=041 bgcolor=#E9E9E9
| 319041 ||  || — || November 1, 2005 || Mount Lemmon || Mount Lemmon Survey || — || align=right | 2.6 km || 
|-id=042 bgcolor=#d6d6d6
| 319042 ||  || — || November 2, 2005 || Mount Lemmon || Mount Lemmon Survey || — || align=right | 3.3 km || 
|-id=043 bgcolor=#d6d6d6
| 319043 ||  || — || November 6, 2005 || Kitt Peak || Spacewatch || KAR || align=right | 1.2 km || 
|-id=044 bgcolor=#d6d6d6
| 319044 ||  || — || September 27, 1994 || Kitt Peak || Spacewatch || — || align=right | 3.2 km || 
|-id=045 bgcolor=#E9E9E9
| 319045 ||  || — || October 25, 2005 || Kitt Peak || Spacewatch || MRX || align=right | 1.1 km || 
|-id=046 bgcolor=#d6d6d6
| 319046 ||  || — || November 6, 2005 || Mount Lemmon || Mount Lemmon Survey || K-2 || align=right | 1.5 km || 
|-id=047 bgcolor=#E9E9E9
| 319047 ||  || — || November 6, 2005 || Mount Lemmon || Mount Lemmon Survey || — || align=right | 1.6 km || 
|-id=048 bgcolor=#fefefe
| 319048 ||  || — || November 10, 2005 || Mount Lemmon || Mount Lemmon Survey || FLO || align=right data-sort-value="0.96" | 960 m || 
|-id=049 bgcolor=#E9E9E9
| 319049 ||  || — || November 2, 2005 || Mount Lemmon || Mount Lemmon Survey || HOF || align=right | 3.8 km || 
|-id=050 bgcolor=#E9E9E9
| 319050 ||  || — || November 1, 2005 || Apache Point || A. C. Becker || — || align=right | 1.4 km || 
|-id=051 bgcolor=#E9E9E9
| 319051 ||  || — || November 1, 2005 || Apache Point || A. C. Becker || — || align=right | 1.6 km || 
|-id=052 bgcolor=#E9E9E9
| 319052 ||  || — || October 8, 2005 || Kitt Peak || Spacewatch || WIT || align=right data-sort-value="0.94" | 940 m || 
|-id=053 bgcolor=#d6d6d6
| 319053 ||  || — || November 1, 2005 || Apache Point || A. C. Becker || — || align=right | 3.0 km || 
|-id=054 bgcolor=#fefefe
| 319054 ||  || — || November 21, 2005 || Palomar || NEAT || FLO || align=right data-sort-value="0.63" | 630 m || 
|-id=055 bgcolor=#d6d6d6
| 319055 ||  || — || October 27, 2005 || Mount Lemmon || Mount Lemmon Survey || EOS || align=right | 2.3 km || 
|-id=056 bgcolor=#E9E9E9
| 319056 ||  || — || November 22, 2005 || Kitt Peak || Spacewatch || — || align=right | 2.8 km || 
|-id=057 bgcolor=#d6d6d6
| 319057 ||  || — || October 1, 2005 || Mount Lemmon || Mount Lemmon Survey || — || align=right | 2.7 km || 
|-id=058 bgcolor=#d6d6d6
| 319058 ||  || — || November 22, 2005 || Kitt Peak || Spacewatch || EOS || align=right | 2.0 km || 
|-id=059 bgcolor=#d6d6d6
| 319059 ||  || — || November 22, 2005 || Kitt Peak || Spacewatch || — || align=right | 2.4 km || 
|-id=060 bgcolor=#d6d6d6
| 319060 ||  || — || November 22, 2005 || Kitt Peak || Spacewatch || — || align=right | 3.1 km || 
|-id=061 bgcolor=#d6d6d6
| 319061 ||  || — || November 21, 2005 || Kitt Peak || Spacewatch || — || align=right | 2.7 km || 
|-id=062 bgcolor=#d6d6d6
| 319062 ||  || — || November 21, 2005 || Kitt Peak || Spacewatch || — || align=right | 2.6 km || 
|-id=063 bgcolor=#d6d6d6
| 319063 ||  || — || October 27, 2005 || Mount Lemmon || Mount Lemmon Survey || KOR || align=right | 1.6 km || 
|-id=064 bgcolor=#E9E9E9
| 319064 ||  || — || November 21, 2005 || Kitt Peak || Spacewatch || — || align=right | 1.2 km || 
|-id=065 bgcolor=#E9E9E9
| 319065 ||  || — || November 21, 2005 || Kitt Peak || Spacewatch || AGN || align=right | 1.5 km || 
|-id=066 bgcolor=#d6d6d6
| 319066 ||  || — || November 21, 2005 || Kitt Peak || Spacewatch || EOS || align=right | 3.1 km || 
|-id=067 bgcolor=#d6d6d6
| 319067 ||  || — || November 21, 2005 || Catalina || CSS || 628 || align=right | 2.9 km || 
|-id=068 bgcolor=#d6d6d6
| 319068 ||  || — || November 22, 2005 || Kitt Peak || Spacewatch || KOR || align=right | 1.5 km || 
|-id=069 bgcolor=#d6d6d6
| 319069 ||  || — || November 9, 2005 || Kitt Peak || Spacewatch || EOS || align=right | 2.3 km || 
|-id=070 bgcolor=#d6d6d6
| 319070 ||  || — || November 21, 2005 || Kitt Peak || Spacewatch || CHA || align=right | 2.9 km || 
|-id=071 bgcolor=#d6d6d6
| 319071 ||  || — || November 25, 2005 || Marly || P. Kocher || — || align=right | 4.5 km || 
|-id=072 bgcolor=#E9E9E9
| 319072 ||  || — || November 29, 2005 || Junk Bond || D. Healy || — || align=right | 2.3 km || 
|-id=073 bgcolor=#fefefe
| 319073 ||  || — || November 28, 2005 || Palomar || NEAT || H || align=right data-sort-value="0.83" | 830 m || 
|-id=074 bgcolor=#d6d6d6
| 319074 ||  || — || November 26, 2005 || Mount Lemmon || Mount Lemmon Survey || EOS || align=right | 2.1 km || 
|-id=075 bgcolor=#d6d6d6
| 319075 ||  || — || November 28, 2005 || Mount Lemmon || Mount Lemmon Survey || — || align=right | 3.6 km || 
|-id=076 bgcolor=#d6d6d6
| 319076 ||  || — || November 28, 2005 || Mount Lemmon || Mount Lemmon Survey || Tj (2.98) || align=right | 5.6 km || 
|-id=077 bgcolor=#d6d6d6
| 319077 ||  || — || November 26, 2005 || Kitt Peak || Spacewatch || EUP || align=right | 4.6 km || 
|-id=078 bgcolor=#fefefe
| 319078 ||  || — || November 25, 2005 || Mount Lemmon || Mount Lemmon Survey || — || align=right | 1.1 km || 
|-id=079 bgcolor=#d6d6d6
| 319079 ||  || — || November 26, 2005 || Kitt Peak || Spacewatch || KAR || align=right | 1.3 km || 
|-id=080 bgcolor=#E9E9E9
| 319080 ||  || — || November 28, 2005 || Kitt Peak || Spacewatch || — || align=right | 1.7 km || 
|-id=081 bgcolor=#d6d6d6
| 319081 ||  || — || November 25, 2005 || Catalina || CSS || — || align=right | 5.3 km || 
|-id=082 bgcolor=#d6d6d6
| 319082 ||  || — || November 25, 2005 || Catalina || CSS || — || align=right | 3.8 km || 
|-id=083 bgcolor=#d6d6d6
| 319083 ||  || — || November 29, 2005 || Mount Lemmon || Mount Lemmon Survey || — || align=right | 4.2 km || 
|-id=084 bgcolor=#d6d6d6
| 319084 ||  || — || October 24, 2005 || Kitt Peak || Spacewatch || EOS || align=right | 2.1 km || 
|-id=085 bgcolor=#d6d6d6
| 319085 ||  || — || November 1, 2005 || Kitt Peak || Spacewatch || — || align=right | 2.1 km || 
|-id=086 bgcolor=#d6d6d6
| 319086 ||  || — || November 25, 2005 || Mount Lemmon || Mount Lemmon Survey || — || align=right | 3.2 km || 
|-id=087 bgcolor=#d6d6d6
| 319087 ||  || — || November 25, 2005 || Mount Lemmon || Mount Lemmon Survey || K-2 || align=right | 1.3 km || 
|-id=088 bgcolor=#E9E9E9
| 319088 ||  || — || November 26, 2005 || Kitt Peak || Spacewatch || — || align=right | 1.9 km || 
|-id=089 bgcolor=#d6d6d6
| 319089 ||  || — || November 26, 2005 || Mount Lemmon || Mount Lemmon Survey || — || align=right | 3.6 km || 
|-id=090 bgcolor=#d6d6d6
| 319090 ||  || — || November 26, 2005 || Mount Lemmon || Mount Lemmon Survey || — || align=right | 3.0 km || 
|-id=091 bgcolor=#d6d6d6
| 319091 ||  || — || November 25, 2005 || Kitt Peak || Spacewatch || — || align=right | 2.6 km || 
|-id=092 bgcolor=#d6d6d6
| 319092 ||  || — || November 25, 2005 || Kitt Peak || Spacewatch || — || align=right | 2.0 km || 
|-id=093 bgcolor=#E9E9E9
| 319093 ||  || — || November 26, 2005 || Catalina || CSS || WIT || align=right | 1.4 km || 
|-id=094 bgcolor=#E9E9E9
| 319094 ||  || — || November 28, 2005 || Kitt Peak || Spacewatch || MAR || align=right | 1.6 km || 
|-id=095 bgcolor=#E9E9E9
| 319095 ||  || — || November 28, 2005 || Kitt Peak || Spacewatch || — || align=right | 1.7 km || 
|-id=096 bgcolor=#d6d6d6
| 319096 ||  || — || November 22, 2005 || Kitt Peak || Spacewatch || LIX || align=right | 5.3 km || 
|-id=097 bgcolor=#d6d6d6
| 319097 ||  || — || November 28, 2005 || Kitt Peak || Spacewatch || HYG || align=right | 2.5 km || 
|-id=098 bgcolor=#d6d6d6
| 319098 ||  || — || November 29, 2005 || Mount Lemmon || Mount Lemmon Survey || — || align=right | 2.0 km || 
|-id=099 bgcolor=#d6d6d6
| 319099 ||  || — || November 22, 2005 || Kitt Peak || Spacewatch || — || align=right | 2.9 km || 
|-id=100 bgcolor=#d6d6d6
| 319100 ||  || — || November 29, 2005 || Mount Lemmon || Mount Lemmon Survey || — || align=right | 3.1 km || 
|}

319101–319200 

|-bgcolor=#d6d6d6
| 319101 ||  || — || November 30, 2005 || Mount Lemmon || Mount Lemmon Survey || KOR || align=right | 1.4 km || 
|-id=102 bgcolor=#fefefe
| 319102 ||  || — || November 30, 2005 || Socorro || LINEAR || NYS || align=right data-sort-value="0.85" | 850 m || 
|-id=103 bgcolor=#fefefe
| 319103 ||  || — || November 28, 2005 || Socorro || LINEAR || — || align=right | 1.1 km || 
|-id=104 bgcolor=#E9E9E9
| 319104 ||  || — || November 22, 2005 || Catalina || CSS || — || align=right | 3.5 km || 
|-id=105 bgcolor=#d6d6d6
| 319105 ||  || — || November 30, 2005 || Anderson Mesa || LONEOS || TIR || align=right | 4.7 km || 
|-id=106 bgcolor=#E9E9E9
| 319106 ||  || — || November 28, 2005 || Catalina || CSS || HOF || align=right | 3.4 km || 
|-id=107 bgcolor=#d6d6d6
| 319107 ||  || — || November 30, 2005 || Kitt Peak || Spacewatch || — || align=right | 2.6 km || 
|-id=108 bgcolor=#d6d6d6
| 319108 ||  || — || November 25, 2005 || Mount Lemmon || Mount Lemmon Survey || — || align=right | 4.1 km || 
|-id=109 bgcolor=#fefefe
| 319109 ||  || — || December 1, 2005 || Junk Bond || D. Healy || NYS || align=right data-sort-value="0.80" | 800 m || 
|-id=110 bgcolor=#d6d6d6
| 319110 ||  || — || December 1, 2005 || Kitt Peak || Spacewatch || — || align=right | 3.7 km || 
|-id=111 bgcolor=#d6d6d6
| 319111 ||  || — || December 1, 2005 || Kitt Peak || Spacewatch || — || align=right | 3.3 km || 
|-id=112 bgcolor=#fefefe
| 319112 ||  || — || December 1, 2005 || Kitt Peak || Spacewatch || — || align=right | 1.2 km || 
|-id=113 bgcolor=#d6d6d6
| 319113 ||  || — || December 1, 2005 || Kitt Peak || Spacewatch || — || align=right | 3.1 km || 
|-id=114 bgcolor=#fefefe
| 319114 ||  || — || December 4, 2005 || Kitt Peak || Spacewatch || — || align=right data-sort-value="0.92" | 920 m || 
|-id=115 bgcolor=#E9E9E9
| 319115 ||  || — || December 4, 2005 || Kitt Peak || Spacewatch || MAR || align=right | 1.7 km || 
|-id=116 bgcolor=#d6d6d6
| 319116 ||  || — || December 5, 2005 || Mount Lemmon || Mount Lemmon Survey || — || align=right | 2.4 km || 
|-id=117 bgcolor=#d6d6d6
| 319117 ||  || — || December 6, 2005 || Socorro || LINEAR || — || align=right | 3.7 km || 
|-id=118 bgcolor=#d6d6d6
| 319118 ||  || — || December 7, 2005 || Socorro || LINEAR || FIR || align=right | 4.9 km || 
|-id=119 bgcolor=#fefefe
| 319119 ||  || — || December 3, 2005 || Kitt Peak || Spacewatch || — || align=right data-sort-value="0.83" | 830 m || 
|-id=120 bgcolor=#d6d6d6
| 319120 ||  || — || December 6, 2005 || Kitt Peak || Spacewatch || EOS || align=right | 2.8 km || 
|-id=121 bgcolor=#E9E9E9
| 319121 ||  || — || December 7, 2005 || Kitt Peak || Spacewatch || — || align=right | 2.6 km || 
|-id=122 bgcolor=#d6d6d6
| 319122 ||  || — || December 7, 2005 || Catalina || CSS || URS || align=right | 4.9 km || 
|-id=123 bgcolor=#d6d6d6
| 319123 ||  || — || December 9, 2005 || Socorro || LINEAR || — || align=right | 3.2 km || 
|-id=124 bgcolor=#d6d6d6
| 319124 ||  || — || December 10, 2005 || Catalina || CSS || — || align=right | 3.5 km || 
|-id=125 bgcolor=#d6d6d6
| 319125 ||  || — || December 5, 2005 || Socorro || LINEAR || — || align=right | 4.2 km || 
|-id=126 bgcolor=#d6d6d6
| 319126 ||  || — || December 8, 2005 || Kitt Peak || Spacewatch || — || align=right | 2.9 km || 
|-id=127 bgcolor=#d6d6d6
| 319127 ||  || — || December 1, 2005 || Kitt Peak || M. W. Buie || — || align=right | 3.2 km || 
|-id=128 bgcolor=#E9E9E9
| 319128 ||  || — || December 5, 2005 || Kitt Peak || Spacewatch || — || align=right | 2.3 km || 
|-id=129 bgcolor=#d6d6d6
| 319129 ||  || — || November 6, 2005 || Mount Lemmon || Mount Lemmon Survey || — || align=right | 2.9 km || 
|-id=130 bgcolor=#d6d6d6
| 319130 ||  || — || December 21, 2005 || Catalina || CSS || — || align=right | 3.5 km || 
|-id=131 bgcolor=#d6d6d6
| 319131 ||  || — || December 21, 2005 || Catalina || CSS || — || align=right | 2.9 km || 
|-id=132 bgcolor=#d6d6d6
| 319132 ||  || — || December 22, 2005 || Kitt Peak || Spacewatch || — || align=right | 3.5 km || 
|-id=133 bgcolor=#d6d6d6
| 319133 ||  || — || December 22, 2005 || Kitt Peak || Spacewatch || VER || align=right | 2.6 km || 
|-id=134 bgcolor=#d6d6d6
| 319134 ||  || — || December 20, 2005 || Wrightwood || J. W. Young || — || align=right | 3.3 km || 
|-id=135 bgcolor=#d6d6d6
| 319135 ||  || — || December 21, 2005 || Kitt Peak || Spacewatch || — || align=right | 3.4 km || 
|-id=136 bgcolor=#d6d6d6
| 319136 ||  || — || December 8, 2005 || Kitt Peak || Spacewatch || — || align=right | 3.0 km || 
|-id=137 bgcolor=#E9E9E9
| 319137 ||  || — || December 22, 2005 || Kitt Peak || Spacewatch || — || align=right | 2.1 km || 
|-id=138 bgcolor=#d6d6d6
| 319138 ||  || — || December 22, 2005 || Kitt Peak || Spacewatch || HYG || align=right | 2.8 km || 
|-id=139 bgcolor=#d6d6d6
| 319139 ||  || — || December 22, 2005 || Kitt Peak || Spacewatch || HYG || align=right | 2.8 km || 
|-id=140 bgcolor=#d6d6d6
| 319140 ||  || — || December 23, 2005 || Kitt Peak || Spacewatch || K-2 || align=right | 1.4 km || 
|-id=141 bgcolor=#fefefe
| 319141 ||  || — || December 24, 2005 || Kitt Peak || Spacewatch || NYS || align=right data-sort-value="0.64" | 640 m || 
|-id=142 bgcolor=#d6d6d6
| 319142 ||  || — || December 24, 2005 || Kitt Peak || Spacewatch || THM || align=right | 2.3 km || 
|-id=143 bgcolor=#d6d6d6
| 319143 ||  || — || December 24, 2005 || Kitt Peak || Spacewatch || — || align=right | 4.1 km || 
|-id=144 bgcolor=#d6d6d6
| 319144 ||  || — || December 24, 2005 || Kitt Peak || Spacewatch || — || align=right | 2.9 km || 
|-id=145 bgcolor=#fefefe
| 319145 ||  || — || December 22, 2005 || Kitt Peak || Spacewatch || V || align=right data-sort-value="0.76" | 760 m || 
|-id=146 bgcolor=#d6d6d6
| 319146 ||  || — || December 22, 2005 || Kitt Peak || Spacewatch || THM || align=right | 2.7 km || 
|-id=147 bgcolor=#fefefe
| 319147 ||  || — || December 22, 2005 || Kitt Peak || Spacewatch || — || align=right data-sort-value="0.98" | 980 m || 
|-id=148 bgcolor=#d6d6d6
| 319148 ||  || — || December 21, 2005 || Kitt Peak || Spacewatch || EOS || align=right | 2.6 km || 
|-id=149 bgcolor=#d6d6d6
| 319149 ||  || — || December 22, 2005 || Kitt Peak || Spacewatch || — || align=right | 4.4 km || 
|-id=150 bgcolor=#d6d6d6
| 319150 ||  || — || December 22, 2005 || Kitt Peak || Spacewatch || — || align=right | 4.6 km || 
|-id=151 bgcolor=#d6d6d6
| 319151 ||  || — || December 22, 2005 || Kitt Peak || Spacewatch || — || align=right | 2.9 km || 
|-id=152 bgcolor=#d6d6d6
| 319152 ||  || — || December 24, 2005 || Kitt Peak || Spacewatch || — || align=right | 2.6 km || 
|-id=153 bgcolor=#fefefe
| 319153 ||  || — || December 24, 2005 || Kitt Peak || Spacewatch || V || align=right data-sort-value="0.78" | 780 m || 
|-id=154 bgcolor=#d6d6d6
| 319154 ||  || — || December 25, 2005 || Kitt Peak || Spacewatch || — || align=right | 3.0 km || 
|-id=155 bgcolor=#d6d6d6
| 319155 ||  || — || October 27, 2005 || Mount Lemmon || Mount Lemmon Survey || — || align=right | 4.9 km || 
|-id=156 bgcolor=#d6d6d6
| 319156 ||  || — || December 26, 2005 || Kitt Peak || Spacewatch || LIX || align=right | 3.6 km || 
|-id=157 bgcolor=#d6d6d6
| 319157 ||  || — || December 26, 2005 || Kitt Peak || Spacewatch || THM || align=right | 3.2 km || 
|-id=158 bgcolor=#d6d6d6
| 319158 ||  || — || December 24, 2005 || Kitt Peak || Spacewatch || — || align=right | 4.1 km || 
|-id=159 bgcolor=#d6d6d6
| 319159 ||  || — || December 24, 2005 || Kitt Peak || Spacewatch || — || align=right | 2.2 km || 
|-id=160 bgcolor=#d6d6d6
| 319160 ||  || — || December 24, 2005 || Kitt Peak || Spacewatch || — || align=right | 3.5 km || 
|-id=161 bgcolor=#d6d6d6
| 319161 ||  || — || December 24, 2005 || Kitt Peak || Spacewatch || — || align=right | 3.7 km || 
|-id=162 bgcolor=#fefefe
| 319162 ||  || — || December 24, 2005 || Kitt Peak || Spacewatch || NYS || align=right data-sort-value="0.76" | 760 m || 
|-id=163 bgcolor=#d6d6d6
| 319163 ||  || — || December 24, 2005 || Kitt Peak || Spacewatch || HYG || align=right | 3.4 km || 
|-id=164 bgcolor=#d6d6d6
| 319164 ||  || — || December 24, 2005 || Kitt Peak || Spacewatch || — || align=right | 3.0 km || 
|-id=165 bgcolor=#d6d6d6
| 319165 ||  || — || November 26, 2005 || Mount Lemmon || Mount Lemmon Survey || VER || align=right | 3.5 km || 
|-id=166 bgcolor=#E9E9E9
| 319166 ||  || — || December 25, 2005 || Mount Lemmon || Mount Lemmon Survey || ADE || align=right | 3.9 km || 
|-id=167 bgcolor=#d6d6d6
| 319167 ||  || — || December 27, 2005 || Mount Lemmon || Mount Lemmon Survey || AEG || align=right | 4.1 km || 
|-id=168 bgcolor=#d6d6d6
| 319168 ||  || — || December 28, 2005 || Kitt Peak || Spacewatch || — || align=right | 2.7 km || 
|-id=169 bgcolor=#d6d6d6
| 319169 ||  || — || December 25, 2005 || Kitt Peak || Spacewatch || — || align=right | 3.5 km || 
|-id=170 bgcolor=#d6d6d6
| 319170 ||  || — || December 25, 2005 || Kitt Peak || Spacewatch || — || align=right | 2.8 km || 
|-id=171 bgcolor=#d6d6d6
| 319171 ||  || — || December 25, 2005 || Kitt Peak || Spacewatch || — || align=right | 2.8 km || 
|-id=172 bgcolor=#d6d6d6
| 319172 ||  || — || December 25, 2005 || Kitt Peak || Spacewatch || HYG || align=right | 3.3 km || 
|-id=173 bgcolor=#d6d6d6
| 319173 ||  || — || December 25, 2005 || Kitt Peak || Spacewatch || — || align=right | 3.5 km || 
|-id=174 bgcolor=#d6d6d6
| 319174 ||  || — || December 25, 2005 || Kitt Peak || Spacewatch || VER || align=right | 3.1 km || 
|-id=175 bgcolor=#d6d6d6
| 319175 ||  || — || December 25, 2005 || Kitt Peak || Spacewatch || — || align=right | 3.3 km || 
|-id=176 bgcolor=#fefefe
| 319176 ||  || — || December 25, 2005 || Kitt Peak || Spacewatch || — || align=right | 1.1 km || 
|-id=177 bgcolor=#E9E9E9
| 319177 ||  || — || December 25, 2005 || Kitt Peak || Spacewatch || — || align=right | 1.0 km || 
|-id=178 bgcolor=#d6d6d6
| 319178 ||  || — || December 26, 2005 || Mount Lemmon || Mount Lemmon Survey || — || align=right | 3.3 km || 
|-id=179 bgcolor=#E9E9E9
| 319179 ||  || — || December 27, 2005 || Mount Lemmon || Mount Lemmon Survey || — || align=right | 1.1 km || 
|-id=180 bgcolor=#d6d6d6
| 319180 ||  || — || December 26, 2005 || Kitt Peak || Spacewatch || — || align=right | 3.2 km || 
|-id=181 bgcolor=#E9E9E9
| 319181 ||  || — || December 26, 2005 || Kitt Peak || Spacewatch || AGN || align=right | 1.3 km || 
|-id=182 bgcolor=#E9E9E9
| 319182 ||  || — || December 24, 2005 || Kitt Peak || Spacewatch || — || align=right data-sort-value="0.91" | 910 m || 
|-id=183 bgcolor=#d6d6d6
| 319183 ||  || — || December 25, 2005 || Mount Lemmon || Mount Lemmon Survey || — || align=right | 3.6 km || 
|-id=184 bgcolor=#d6d6d6
| 319184 ||  || — || December 25, 2005 || Mount Lemmon || Mount Lemmon Survey || TIR || align=right | 3.5 km || 
|-id=185 bgcolor=#d6d6d6
| 319185 ||  || — || December 26, 2005 || Kitt Peak || Spacewatch || VER || align=right | 4.1 km || 
|-id=186 bgcolor=#d6d6d6
| 319186 ||  || — || December 26, 2005 || Kitt Peak || Spacewatch || — || align=right | 2.8 km || 
|-id=187 bgcolor=#d6d6d6
| 319187 ||  || — || December 28, 2005 || Mount Lemmon || Mount Lemmon Survey || — || align=right | 3.5 km || 
|-id=188 bgcolor=#d6d6d6
| 319188 ||  || — || December 28, 2005 || Mount Lemmon || Mount Lemmon Survey || EOS || align=right | 3.0 km || 
|-id=189 bgcolor=#d6d6d6
| 319189 ||  || — || December 28, 2005 || Mount Lemmon || Mount Lemmon Survey || THM || align=right | 2.4 km || 
|-id=190 bgcolor=#d6d6d6
| 319190 ||  || — || December 29, 2005 || Catalina || CSS || — || align=right | 4.8 km || 
|-id=191 bgcolor=#d6d6d6
| 319191 ||  || — || December 25, 2005 || Kitt Peak || Spacewatch || — || align=right | 2.9 km || 
|-id=192 bgcolor=#fefefe
| 319192 ||  || — || December 25, 2005 || Kitt Peak || Spacewatch || NYS || align=right data-sort-value="0.69" | 690 m || 
|-id=193 bgcolor=#d6d6d6
| 319193 ||  || — || December 29, 2005 || Kitt Peak || Spacewatch || SHU3:2 || align=right | 7.7 km || 
|-id=194 bgcolor=#E9E9E9
| 319194 ||  || — || August 7, 2004 || Palomar || NEAT || — || align=right | 1.1 km || 
|-id=195 bgcolor=#d6d6d6
| 319195 ||  || — || December 27, 2005 || Kitt Peak || Spacewatch || — || align=right | 2.7 km || 
|-id=196 bgcolor=#d6d6d6
| 319196 ||  || — || December 29, 2005 || Catalina || CSS || — || align=right | 3.8 km || 
|-id=197 bgcolor=#d6d6d6
| 319197 ||  || — || November 21, 2005 || Kitt Peak || Spacewatch || TEL || align=right | 1.8 km || 
|-id=198 bgcolor=#d6d6d6
| 319198 ||  || — || December 27, 2005 || Kitt Peak || Spacewatch || — || align=right | 2.7 km || 
|-id=199 bgcolor=#d6d6d6
| 319199 ||  || — || December 22, 2005 || Catalina || CSS || — || align=right | 3.6 km || 
|-id=200 bgcolor=#d6d6d6
| 319200 ||  || — || December 22, 2005 || Kitt Peak || Spacewatch || — || align=right | 4.5 km || 
|}

319201–319300 

|-bgcolor=#d6d6d6
| 319201 ||  || — || December 24, 2005 || Catalina || CSS || THB || align=right | 4.6 km || 
|-id=202 bgcolor=#d6d6d6
| 319202 ||  || — || November 10, 2005 || Kitt Peak || Spacewatch || EUP || align=right | 5.3 km || 
|-id=203 bgcolor=#d6d6d6
| 319203 ||  || — || December 30, 2005 || Kitt Peak || Spacewatch || HYG || align=right | 3.3 km || 
|-id=204 bgcolor=#d6d6d6
| 319204 ||  || — || December 30, 2005 || Kitt Peak || Spacewatch || — || align=right | 3.5 km || 
|-id=205 bgcolor=#d6d6d6
| 319205 ||  || — || December 31, 2005 || Kitt Peak || Spacewatch || LIX || align=right | 4.5 km || 
|-id=206 bgcolor=#E9E9E9
| 319206 ||  || — || December 25, 2005 || Mount Lemmon || Mount Lemmon Survey || — || align=right | 1.8 km || 
|-id=207 bgcolor=#d6d6d6
| 319207 ||  || — || December 25, 2005 || Kitt Peak || Spacewatch || — || align=right | 4.2 km || 
|-id=208 bgcolor=#d6d6d6
| 319208 ||  || — || December 24, 2005 || Kitt Peak || Spacewatch || VER || align=right | 3.6 km || 
|-id=209 bgcolor=#d6d6d6
| 319209 ||  || — || December 26, 2005 || Mount Lemmon || Mount Lemmon Survey || — || align=right | 4.4 km || 
|-id=210 bgcolor=#d6d6d6
| 319210 ||  || — || December 30, 2005 || Kitt Peak || Spacewatch || EOS || align=right | 2.9 km || 
|-id=211 bgcolor=#E9E9E9
| 319211 ||  || — || December 28, 2005 || Palomar || NEAT || MAR || align=right | 1.4 km || 
|-id=212 bgcolor=#d6d6d6
| 319212 ||  || — || December 30, 2005 || Catalina || CSS || — || align=right | 4.3 km || 
|-id=213 bgcolor=#d6d6d6
| 319213 ||  || — || December 25, 2005 || Mount Lemmon || Mount Lemmon Survey || EMA || align=right | 4.3 km || 
|-id=214 bgcolor=#d6d6d6
| 319214 ||  || — || December 28, 2005 || Kitt Peak || Spacewatch || EOS || align=right | 2.1 km || 
|-id=215 bgcolor=#d6d6d6
| 319215 ||  || — || December 28, 2005 || Kitt Peak || Spacewatch || EOS || align=right | 2.4 km || 
|-id=216 bgcolor=#d6d6d6
| 319216 ||  || — || December 29, 2005 || Kitt Peak || Spacewatch || — || align=right | 2.8 km || 
|-id=217 bgcolor=#d6d6d6
| 319217 ||  || — || December 30, 2005 || Kitt Peak || Spacewatch || — || align=right | 3.7 km || 
|-id=218 bgcolor=#d6d6d6
| 319218 ||  || — || December 30, 2005 || Kitt Peak || Spacewatch || THM || align=right | 2.8 km || 
|-id=219 bgcolor=#d6d6d6
| 319219 ||  || — || December 25, 2005 || Kitt Peak || Spacewatch || — || align=right | 3.0 km || 
|-id=220 bgcolor=#d6d6d6
| 319220 ||  || — || December 25, 2005 || Kitt Peak || Spacewatch || — || align=right | 3.4 km || 
|-id=221 bgcolor=#fefefe
| 319221 ||  || — || December 25, 2005 || Kitt Peak || Spacewatch || — || align=right data-sort-value="0.91" | 910 m || 
|-id=222 bgcolor=#d6d6d6
| 319222 ||  || — || December 30, 2005 || Kitt Peak || Spacewatch || — || align=right | 3.4 km || 
|-id=223 bgcolor=#d6d6d6
| 319223 ||  || — || December 30, 2005 || Mount Lemmon || Mount Lemmon Survey || EOS || align=right | 2.8 km || 
|-id=224 bgcolor=#d6d6d6
| 319224 ||  || — || December 26, 2005 || Mount Lemmon || Mount Lemmon Survey || — || align=right | 2.6 km || 
|-id=225 bgcolor=#d6d6d6
| 319225 ||  || — || December 28, 2005 || Kitt Peak || Spacewatch || CHA || align=right | 2.7 km || 
|-id=226 bgcolor=#d6d6d6
| 319226 ||  || — || January 7, 2006 || Socorro || LINEAR || Tj (2.94) || align=right | 5.5 km || 
|-id=227 bgcolor=#d6d6d6
| 319227 Erichbär ||  ||  || January 9, 2006 || Radebeul || M. Fiedler || EOS || align=right | 2.7 km || 
|-id=228 bgcolor=#fefefe
| 319228 ||  || — || January 2, 2006 || Mount Lemmon || Mount Lemmon Survey || NYS || align=right data-sort-value="0.73" | 730 m || 
|-id=229 bgcolor=#E9E9E9
| 319229 ||  || — || January 4, 2006 || Mount Lemmon || Mount Lemmon Survey || — || align=right | 2.3 km || 
|-id=230 bgcolor=#E9E9E9
| 319230 ||  || — || January 5, 2006 || Mount Lemmon || Mount Lemmon Survey || — || align=right data-sort-value="0.97" | 970 m || 
|-id=231 bgcolor=#d6d6d6
| 319231 ||  || — || January 5, 2006 || Kitt Peak || Spacewatch || — || align=right | 2.5 km || 
|-id=232 bgcolor=#d6d6d6
| 319232 ||  || — || January 4, 2006 || Kitt Peak || Spacewatch || — || align=right | 2.9 km || 
|-id=233 bgcolor=#d6d6d6
| 319233 ||  || — || January 4, 2006 || Mount Lemmon || Mount Lemmon Survey || EUP || align=right | 5.9 km || 
|-id=234 bgcolor=#d6d6d6
| 319234 ||  || — || December 5, 2005 || Mount Lemmon || Mount Lemmon Survey || HYG || align=right | 2.6 km || 
|-id=235 bgcolor=#fefefe
| 319235 ||  || — || January 5, 2006 || Mount Lemmon || Mount Lemmon Survey || V || align=right data-sort-value="0.83" | 830 m || 
|-id=236 bgcolor=#d6d6d6
| 319236 ||  || — || January 2, 2006 || Socorro || LINEAR || THB || align=right | 4.6 km || 
|-id=237 bgcolor=#E9E9E9
| 319237 ||  || — || January 7, 2006 || Mount Lemmon || Mount Lemmon Survey || — || align=right | 1.2 km || 
|-id=238 bgcolor=#d6d6d6
| 319238 ||  || — || January 7, 2006 || Mount Lemmon || Mount Lemmon Survey || HYG || align=right | 2.5 km || 
|-id=239 bgcolor=#E9E9E9
| 319239 ||  || — || January 7, 2006 || Kitt Peak || Spacewatch || — || align=right | 1.1 km || 
|-id=240 bgcolor=#d6d6d6
| 319240 ||  || — || January 7, 2006 || Kitt Peak || Spacewatch || — || align=right | 2.5 km || 
|-id=241 bgcolor=#d6d6d6
| 319241 ||  || — || November 29, 2005 || Mount Lemmon || Mount Lemmon Survey || — || align=right | 4.2 km || 
|-id=242 bgcolor=#E9E9E9
| 319242 ||  || — || January 4, 2006 || Kitt Peak || Spacewatch || — || align=right | 2.1 km || 
|-id=243 bgcolor=#d6d6d6
| 319243 ||  || — || May 4, 2002 || Palomar || NEAT || — || align=right | 4.8 km || 
|-id=244 bgcolor=#d6d6d6
| 319244 ||  || — || January 4, 2006 || Mount Lemmon || Mount Lemmon Survey || THM || align=right | 2.9 km || 
|-id=245 bgcolor=#d6d6d6
| 319245 ||  || — || December 2, 2005 || Mount Lemmon || Mount Lemmon Survey || — || align=right | 3.0 km || 
|-id=246 bgcolor=#d6d6d6
| 319246 ||  || — || January 5, 2006 || Kitt Peak || Spacewatch || KAR || align=right | 1.2 km || 
|-id=247 bgcolor=#fefefe
| 319247 ||  || — || January 5, 2006 || Kitt Peak || Spacewatch || — || align=right data-sort-value="0.80" | 800 m || 
|-id=248 bgcolor=#E9E9E9
| 319248 ||  || — || January 7, 2006 || Mount Lemmon || Mount Lemmon Survey || — || align=right | 1.1 km || 
|-id=249 bgcolor=#d6d6d6
| 319249 ||  || — || January 9, 2006 || Kitt Peak || Spacewatch || — || align=right | 3.3 km || 
|-id=250 bgcolor=#d6d6d6
| 319250 ||  || — || January 5, 2006 || Mount Lemmon || Mount Lemmon Survey || THM || align=right | 3.0 km || 
|-id=251 bgcolor=#d6d6d6
| 319251 ||  || — || January 6, 2006 || Kitt Peak || Spacewatch || — || align=right | 3.8 km || 
|-id=252 bgcolor=#d6d6d6
| 319252 ||  || — || January 4, 2006 || Catalina || CSS || — || align=right | 4.5 km || 
|-id=253 bgcolor=#d6d6d6
| 319253 ||  || — || January 10, 2006 || Catalina || CSS || EUP || align=right | 5.3 km || 
|-id=254 bgcolor=#d6d6d6
| 319254 ||  || — || January 5, 2006 || Catalina || CSS || — || align=right | 3.7 km || 
|-id=255 bgcolor=#d6d6d6
| 319255 ||  || — || January 5, 2006 || Socorro || LINEAR || — || align=right | 4.5 km || 
|-id=256 bgcolor=#d6d6d6
| 319256 ||  || — || January 6, 2006 || Anderson Mesa || LONEOS || — || align=right | 4.4 km || 
|-id=257 bgcolor=#d6d6d6
| 319257 ||  || — || January 2, 2006 || Mount Lemmon || Mount Lemmon Survey || — || align=right | 2.5 km || 
|-id=258 bgcolor=#E9E9E9
| 319258 ||  || — || January 7, 2006 || Mount Lemmon || Mount Lemmon Survey || — || align=right | 1.1 km || 
|-id=259 bgcolor=#d6d6d6
| 319259 ||  || — || January 10, 2006 || Mount Lemmon || Mount Lemmon Survey || — || align=right | 4.0 km || 
|-id=260 bgcolor=#E9E9E9
| 319260 ||  || — || January 7, 2006 || Mount Lemmon || Mount Lemmon Survey || — || align=right data-sort-value="0.97" | 970 m || 
|-id=261 bgcolor=#d6d6d6
| 319261 ||  || — || January 21, 2006 || Kitt Peak || Spacewatch || EOS || align=right | 2.6 km || 
|-id=262 bgcolor=#d6d6d6
| 319262 ||  || — || January 22, 2006 || Mayhill || A. Lowe || — || align=right | 5.5 km || 
|-id=263 bgcolor=#d6d6d6
| 319263 ||  || — || January 20, 2006 || Kitt Peak || Spacewatch || THM || align=right | 2.8 km || 
|-id=264 bgcolor=#d6d6d6
| 319264 ||  || — || January 21, 2006 || Kitt Peak || Spacewatch || — || align=right | 3.1 km || 
|-id=265 bgcolor=#d6d6d6
| 319265 ||  || — || January 22, 2006 || Mount Lemmon || Mount Lemmon Survey || — || align=right | 3.8 km || 
|-id=266 bgcolor=#d6d6d6
| 319266 ||  || — || January 22, 2006 || Mount Lemmon || Mount Lemmon Survey || THM || align=right | 2.6 km || 
|-id=267 bgcolor=#d6d6d6
| 319267 ||  || — || January 23, 2006 || Kitt Peak || Spacewatch || — || align=right | 4.5 km || 
|-id=268 bgcolor=#d6d6d6
| 319268 ||  || — || January 20, 2006 || Kitt Peak || Spacewatch || THM || align=right | 3.4 km || 
|-id=269 bgcolor=#E9E9E9
| 319269 ||  || — || January 22, 2006 || Mount Lemmon || Mount Lemmon Survey || — || align=right | 1.4 km || 
|-id=270 bgcolor=#d6d6d6
| 319270 ||  || — || January 23, 2006 || Kitt Peak || Spacewatch || — || align=right | 3.1 km || 
|-id=271 bgcolor=#d6d6d6
| 319271 ||  || — || January 23, 2006 || Kitt Peak || Spacewatch || — || align=right | 3.3 km || 
|-id=272 bgcolor=#fefefe
| 319272 ||  || — || January 23, 2006 || Mount Lemmon || Mount Lemmon Survey || — || align=right data-sort-value="0.91" | 910 m || 
|-id=273 bgcolor=#d6d6d6
| 319273 ||  || — || January 23, 2006 || Mount Lemmon || Mount Lemmon Survey || — || align=right | 5.5 km || 
|-id=274 bgcolor=#d6d6d6
| 319274 ||  || — || January 25, 2006 || Kitt Peak || Spacewatch || THM || align=right | 2.4 km || 
|-id=275 bgcolor=#d6d6d6
| 319275 ||  || — || January 25, 2006 || Kitt Peak || Spacewatch || — || align=right | 4.0 km || 
|-id=276 bgcolor=#d6d6d6
| 319276 ||  || — || January 23, 2006 || Mount Lemmon || Mount Lemmon Survey || THM || align=right | 2.1 km || 
|-id=277 bgcolor=#d6d6d6
| 319277 ||  || — || January 26, 2006 || Catalina || CSS || THM || align=right | 2.7 km || 
|-id=278 bgcolor=#d6d6d6
| 319278 ||  || — || January 22, 2006 || Anderson Mesa || LONEOS || — || align=right | 4.8 km || 
|-id=279 bgcolor=#d6d6d6
| 319279 ||  || — || January 23, 2006 || Kitt Peak || Spacewatch || — || align=right | 3.3 km || 
|-id=280 bgcolor=#d6d6d6
| 319280 ||  || — || January 23, 2006 || Kitt Peak || Spacewatch || HYG || align=right | 3.1 km || 
|-id=281 bgcolor=#fefefe
| 319281 ||  || — || January 23, 2006 || Kitt Peak || Spacewatch || NYS || align=right data-sort-value="0.99" | 990 m || 
|-id=282 bgcolor=#C2FFFF
| 319282 ||  || — || January 23, 2006 || Kitt Peak || Spacewatch || L5 || align=right | 11 km || 
|-id=283 bgcolor=#d6d6d6
| 319283 ||  || — || January 23, 2006 || Kitt Peak || Spacewatch || — || align=right | 5.4 km || 
|-id=284 bgcolor=#fefefe
| 319284 ||  || — || January 23, 2006 || Mount Lemmon || Mount Lemmon Survey || — || align=right | 1.3 km || 
|-id=285 bgcolor=#d6d6d6
| 319285 ||  || — || January 23, 2006 || Mount Lemmon || Mount Lemmon Survey || ANF || align=right | 1.8 km || 
|-id=286 bgcolor=#d6d6d6
| 319286 ||  || — || January 24, 2006 || Mount Lemmon || Mount Lemmon Survey || — || align=right | 2.7 km || 
|-id=287 bgcolor=#fefefe
| 319287 ||  || — || January 25, 2006 || Kitt Peak || Spacewatch || — || align=right | 1.4 km || 
|-id=288 bgcolor=#d6d6d6
| 319288 ||  || — || January 25, 2006 || Kitt Peak || Spacewatch || — || align=right | 3.1 km || 
|-id=289 bgcolor=#d6d6d6
| 319289 ||  || — || January 25, 2006 || Kitt Peak || Spacewatch || THM || align=right | 2.4 km || 
|-id=290 bgcolor=#d6d6d6
| 319290 ||  || — || January 25, 2006 || Kitt Peak || Spacewatch || HYG || align=right | 3.7 km || 
|-id=291 bgcolor=#d6d6d6
| 319291 ||  || — || January 25, 2006 || Kitt Peak || Spacewatch || — || align=right | 2.6 km || 
|-id=292 bgcolor=#d6d6d6
| 319292 ||  || — || January 26, 2006 || Kitt Peak || Spacewatch || EOS || align=right | 2.4 km || 
|-id=293 bgcolor=#d6d6d6
| 319293 ||  || — || January 26, 2006 || Kitt Peak || Spacewatch || — || align=right | 3.5 km || 
|-id=294 bgcolor=#d6d6d6
| 319294 ||  || — || January 26, 2006 || Catalina || CSS || EOS || align=right | 2.7 km || 
|-id=295 bgcolor=#d6d6d6
| 319295 ||  || — || January 4, 2006 || Mount Lemmon || Mount Lemmon Survey || 7:4 || align=right | 4.0 km || 
|-id=296 bgcolor=#d6d6d6
| 319296 ||  || — || January 23, 2006 || Mount Lemmon || Mount Lemmon Survey || — || align=right | 3.1 km || 
|-id=297 bgcolor=#fefefe
| 319297 ||  || — || January 23, 2006 || Mount Lemmon || Mount Lemmon Survey || NYS || align=right data-sort-value="0.62" | 620 m || 
|-id=298 bgcolor=#d6d6d6
| 319298 ||  || — || January 25, 2006 || Kitt Peak || Spacewatch || EOS || align=right | 2.4 km || 
|-id=299 bgcolor=#d6d6d6
| 319299 ||  || — || January 25, 2006 || Kitt Peak || Spacewatch || — || align=right | 4.5 km || 
|-id=300 bgcolor=#d6d6d6
| 319300 ||  || — || January 25, 2006 || Kitt Peak || Spacewatch || — || align=right | 3.4 km || 
|}

319301–319400 

|-bgcolor=#d6d6d6
| 319301 ||  || — || January 25, 2006 || Kitt Peak || Spacewatch || — || align=right | 3.1 km || 
|-id=302 bgcolor=#d6d6d6
| 319302 ||  || — || January 26, 2006 || Kitt Peak || Spacewatch || 7:4 || align=right | 4.4 km || 
|-id=303 bgcolor=#d6d6d6
| 319303 ||  || — || January 26, 2006 || Mount Lemmon || Mount Lemmon Survey || — || align=right | 3.2 km || 
|-id=304 bgcolor=#d6d6d6
| 319304 ||  || — || January 26, 2006 || Kitt Peak || Spacewatch || — || align=right | 4.2 km || 
|-id=305 bgcolor=#d6d6d6
| 319305 ||  || — || January 26, 2006 || Kitt Peak || Spacewatch || — || align=right | 4.3 km || 
|-id=306 bgcolor=#d6d6d6
| 319306 ||  || — || January 26, 2006 || Kitt Peak || Spacewatch || — || align=right | 2.9 km || 
|-id=307 bgcolor=#d6d6d6
| 319307 ||  || — || January 27, 2006 || Kitt Peak || Spacewatch || HYG || align=right | 3.1 km || 
|-id=308 bgcolor=#E9E9E9
| 319308 ||  || — || January 26, 2006 || Kitt Peak || Spacewatch || — || align=right | 1.5 km || 
|-id=309 bgcolor=#d6d6d6
| 319309 ||  || — || January 26, 2006 || Kitt Peak || Spacewatch || HYG || align=right | 3.5 km || 
|-id=310 bgcolor=#E9E9E9
| 319310 ||  || — || January 21, 2006 || Anderson Mesa || LONEOS || — || align=right | 2.5 km || 
|-id=311 bgcolor=#d6d6d6
| 319311 ||  || — || January 28, 2006 || Bergisch Gladbach || W. Bickel || HYG || align=right | 2.9 km || 
|-id=312 bgcolor=#E9E9E9
| 319312 ||  || — || August 7, 2004 || Campo Imperatore || CINEOS || — || align=right | 1.4 km || 
|-id=313 bgcolor=#fefefe
| 319313 ||  || — || January 25, 2006 || Kitt Peak || Spacewatch || MAS || align=right data-sort-value="0.88" | 880 m || 
|-id=314 bgcolor=#E9E9E9
| 319314 ||  || — || January 25, 2006 || Kitt Peak || Spacewatch || — || align=right | 1.7 km || 
|-id=315 bgcolor=#d6d6d6
| 319315 ||  || — || January 25, 2006 || Kitt Peak || Spacewatch || — || align=right | 3.4 km || 
|-id=316 bgcolor=#d6d6d6
| 319316 ||  || — || January 26, 2006 || Kitt Peak || Spacewatch || — || align=right | 3.9 km || 
|-id=317 bgcolor=#d6d6d6
| 319317 ||  || — || January 26, 2006 || Mount Lemmon || Mount Lemmon Survey || VER || align=right | 4.0 km || 
|-id=318 bgcolor=#d6d6d6
| 319318 ||  || — || January 26, 2006 || Mount Lemmon || Mount Lemmon Survey || HYG || align=right | 3.3 km || 
|-id=319 bgcolor=#d6d6d6
| 319319 ||  || — || January 26, 2006 || Mount Lemmon || Mount Lemmon Survey || — || align=right | 3.9 km || 
|-id=320 bgcolor=#d6d6d6
| 319320 ||  || — || January 26, 2006 || Mount Lemmon || Mount Lemmon Survey || — || align=right | 3.9 km || 
|-id=321 bgcolor=#d6d6d6
| 319321 ||  || — || January 26, 2006 || Mount Lemmon || Mount Lemmon Survey || HYG || align=right | 3.8 km || 
|-id=322 bgcolor=#d6d6d6
| 319322 ||  || — || January 27, 2006 || Kitt Peak || Spacewatch || — || align=right | 4.0 km || 
|-id=323 bgcolor=#E9E9E9
| 319323 ||  || — || January 27, 2006 || Kitt Peak || Spacewatch || — || align=right | 1.2 km || 
|-id=324 bgcolor=#d6d6d6
| 319324 ||  || — || January 27, 2006 || Kitt Peak || Spacewatch || — || align=right | 4.0 km || 
|-id=325 bgcolor=#d6d6d6
| 319325 ||  || — || January 27, 2006 || Mount Lemmon || Mount Lemmon Survey || — || align=right | 3.4 km || 
|-id=326 bgcolor=#fefefe
| 319326 ||  || — || April 7, 2003 || Kitt Peak || Spacewatch || MAS || align=right data-sort-value="0.86" | 860 m || 
|-id=327 bgcolor=#d6d6d6
| 319327 ||  || — || January 27, 2006 || Mount Lemmon || Mount Lemmon Survey || — || align=right | 3.7 km || 
|-id=328 bgcolor=#d6d6d6
| 319328 ||  || — || December 30, 2005 || Mount Lemmon || Mount Lemmon Survey || VER || align=right | 3.3 km || 
|-id=329 bgcolor=#E9E9E9
| 319329 ||  || — || January 30, 2006 || Kitt Peak || Spacewatch || HEN || align=right | 1.3 km || 
|-id=330 bgcolor=#d6d6d6
| 319330 ||  || — || January 31, 2006 || Kitt Peak || Spacewatch || — || align=right | 2.5 km || 
|-id=331 bgcolor=#fefefe
| 319331 ||  || — || January 31, 2006 || Mount Lemmon || Mount Lemmon Survey || — || align=right | 1.1 km || 
|-id=332 bgcolor=#d6d6d6
| 319332 ||  || — || January 31, 2006 || Kitt Peak || Spacewatch || VER || align=right | 4.0 km || 
|-id=333 bgcolor=#d6d6d6
| 319333 ||  || — || January 30, 2006 || Kitt Peak || Spacewatch || URS || align=right | 3.7 km || 
|-id=334 bgcolor=#d6d6d6
| 319334 ||  || — || January 31, 2006 || Kitt Peak || Spacewatch || VER || align=right | 4.5 km || 
|-id=335 bgcolor=#d6d6d6
| 319335 ||  || — || January 31, 2006 || Kitt Peak || Spacewatch || TIR || align=right | 5.4 km || 
|-id=336 bgcolor=#d6d6d6
| 319336 ||  || — || January 31, 2006 || Kitt Peak || Spacewatch || — || align=right | 3.3 km || 
|-id=337 bgcolor=#d6d6d6
| 319337 ||  || — || January 31, 2006 || Kitt Peak || Spacewatch || — || align=right | 3.9 km || 
|-id=338 bgcolor=#E9E9E9
| 319338 ||  || — || January 31, 2006 || Mount Lemmon || Mount Lemmon Survey || — || align=right | 1.4 km || 
|-id=339 bgcolor=#d6d6d6
| 319339 ||  || — || January 31, 2006 || Kitt Peak || Spacewatch || — || align=right | 4.4 km || 
|-id=340 bgcolor=#d6d6d6
| 319340 ||  || — || January 31, 2006 || Kitt Peak || Spacewatch || — || align=right | 5.7 km || 
|-id=341 bgcolor=#d6d6d6
| 319341 ||  || — || January 26, 2006 || Catalina || CSS || EUP || align=right | 6.7 km || 
|-id=342 bgcolor=#C2FFFF
| 319342 ||  || — || January 25, 2006 || Kitt Peak || Spacewatch || L5 || align=right | 9.3 km || 
|-id=343 bgcolor=#E9E9E9
| 319343 ||  || — || January 27, 2006 || Mount Lemmon || Mount Lemmon Survey || — || align=right | 1.6 km || 
|-id=344 bgcolor=#d6d6d6
| 319344 ||  || — || January 22, 2006 || Mount Lemmon || Mount Lemmon Survey || — || align=right | 4.4 km || 
|-id=345 bgcolor=#d6d6d6
| 319345 ||  || — || February 1, 2006 || Mount Lemmon || Mount Lemmon Survey || — || align=right | 3.7 km || 
|-id=346 bgcolor=#d6d6d6
| 319346 ||  || — || February 1, 2006 || Kitt Peak || Spacewatch || CHA || align=right | 2.2 km || 
|-id=347 bgcolor=#d6d6d6
| 319347 ||  || — || February 1, 2006 || Mount Lemmon || Mount Lemmon Survey || — || align=right | 3.7 km || 
|-id=348 bgcolor=#d6d6d6
| 319348 ||  || — || February 1, 2006 || Kitt Peak || Spacewatch || HYG || align=right | 4.0 km || 
|-id=349 bgcolor=#d6d6d6
| 319349 ||  || — || February 2, 2006 || Kitt Peak || Spacewatch || THM || align=right | 2.9 km || 
|-id=350 bgcolor=#d6d6d6
| 319350 ||  || — || February 2, 2006 || Kitt Peak || Spacewatch || — || align=right | 4.3 km || 
|-id=351 bgcolor=#fefefe
| 319351 ||  || — || February 2, 2006 || Mount Lemmon || Mount Lemmon Survey || — || align=right data-sort-value="0.78" | 780 m || 
|-id=352 bgcolor=#d6d6d6
| 319352 ||  || — || February 2, 2006 || Kitt Peak || Spacewatch || HYG || align=right | 3.8 km || 
|-id=353 bgcolor=#E9E9E9
| 319353 ||  || — || February 3, 2006 || Kitt Peak || Spacewatch || — || align=right | 3.8 km || 
|-id=354 bgcolor=#d6d6d6
| 319354 ||  || — || February 4, 2006 || Kitt Peak || Spacewatch || HYG || align=right | 3.7 km || 
|-id=355 bgcolor=#d6d6d6
| 319355 ||  || — || December 24, 2005 || Catalina || CSS || — || align=right | 4.7 km || 
|-id=356 bgcolor=#d6d6d6
| 319356 ||  || — || February 6, 2006 || Mount Lemmon || Mount Lemmon Survey || 7:4 || align=right | 3.4 km || 
|-id=357 bgcolor=#d6d6d6
| 319357 ||  || — || February 3, 2006 || Anderson Mesa || LONEOS || — || align=right | 4.2 km || 
|-id=358 bgcolor=#d6d6d6
| 319358 ||  || — || February 2, 2006 || Mauna Kea || P. A. Wiegert || — || align=right | 2.7 km || 
|-id=359 bgcolor=#d6d6d6
| 319359 ||  || — || February 20, 2006 || Kitt Peak || Spacewatch || — || align=right | 3.4 km || 
|-id=360 bgcolor=#E9E9E9
| 319360 ||  || — || February 21, 2006 || Catalina || CSS || — || align=right | 1.1 km || 
|-id=361 bgcolor=#E9E9E9
| 319361 ||  || — || February 4, 2006 || Kitt Peak || Spacewatch || — || align=right | 1.4 km || 
|-id=362 bgcolor=#fefefe
| 319362 ||  || — || February 20, 2006 || Kitt Peak || Spacewatch || NYS || align=right data-sort-value="0.76" | 760 m || 
|-id=363 bgcolor=#fefefe
| 319363 ||  || — || February 20, 2006 || Kitt Peak || Spacewatch || MAS || align=right data-sort-value="0.81" | 810 m || 
|-id=364 bgcolor=#E9E9E9
| 319364 ||  || — || February 20, 2006 || Kitt Peak || Spacewatch || — || align=right | 2.6 km || 
|-id=365 bgcolor=#d6d6d6
| 319365 ||  || — || February 20, 2006 || Mount Lemmon || Mount Lemmon Survey || THM || align=right | 2.5 km || 
|-id=366 bgcolor=#E9E9E9
| 319366 ||  || — || February 24, 2006 || Kitt Peak || Spacewatch || — || align=right | 1.2 km || 
|-id=367 bgcolor=#d6d6d6
| 319367 ||  || — || February 20, 2006 || Socorro || LINEAR || — || align=right | 3.9 km || 
|-id=368 bgcolor=#fefefe
| 319368 ||  || — || February 23, 2006 || Anderson Mesa || LONEOS || — || align=right | 1.0 km || 
|-id=369 bgcolor=#d6d6d6
| 319369 ||  || — || February 20, 2006 || Kitt Peak || Spacewatch || — || align=right | 3.1 km || 
|-id=370 bgcolor=#d6d6d6
| 319370 ||  || — || February 21, 2006 || Mount Lemmon || Mount Lemmon Survey || VER || align=right | 3.1 km || 
|-id=371 bgcolor=#d6d6d6
| 319371 ||  || — || February 22, 2006 || Catalina || CSS || — || align=right | 4.1 km || 
|-id=372 bgcolor=#d6d6d6
| 319372 ||  || — || February 23, 2006 || Mount Lemmon || Mount Lemmon Survey || — || align=right | 3.5 km || 
|-id=373 bgcolor=#E9E9E9
| 319373 ||  || — || February 24, 2006 || Kitt Peak || Spacewatch || — || align=right | 1.4 km || 
|-id=374 bgcolor=#E9E9E9
| 319374 ||  || — || February 24, 2006 || Kitt Peak || Spacewatch || — || align=right | 1.6 km || 
|-id=375 bgcolor=#fefefe
| 319375 ||  || — || February 24, 2006 || Kitt Peak || Spacewatch || — || align=right data-sort-value="0.69" | 690 m || 
|-id=376 bgcolor=#d6d6d6
| 319376 ||  || — || February 27, 2006 || Kitt Peak || Spacewatch || — || align=right | 3.7 km || 
|-id=377 bgcolor=#d6d6d6
| 319377 ||  || — || February 20, 2006 || Socorro || LINEAR || — || align=right | 6.0 km || 
|-id=378 bgcolor=#C2FFFF
| 319378 ||  || — || February 25, 2006 || Kitt Peak || Spacewatch || L5 || align=right | 9.3 km || 
|-id=379 bgcolor=#d6d6d6
| 319379 ||  || — || February 25, 2006 || Mount Lemmon || Mount Lemmon Survey || — || align=right | 3.6 km || 
|-id=380 bgcolor=#d6d6d6
| 319380 ||  || — || February 25, 2006 || Kitt Peak || Spacewatch || — || align=right | 3.3 km || 
|-id=381 bgcolor=#d6d6d6
| 319381 ||  || — || September 28, 2003 || Kitt Peak || Spacewatch || — || align=right | 3.1 km || 
|-id=382 bgcolor=#fefefe
| 319382 ||  || — || February 25, 2006 || Kitt Peak || Spacewatch || — || align=right data-sort-value="0.83" | 830 m || 
|-id=383 bgcolor=#E9E9E9
| 319383 ||  || — || February 27, 2006 || Kitt Peak || Spacewatch || — || align=right | 1.8 km || 
|-id=384 bgcolor=#d6d6d6
| 319384 ||  || — || February 27, 2006 || Catalina || CSS || EUP || align=right | 4.6 km || 
|-id=385 bgcolor=#d6d6d6
| 319385 ||  || — || February 27, 2006 || Mount Lemmon || Mount Lemmon Survey || — || align=right | 3.8 km || 
|-id=386 bgcolor=#d6d6d6
| 319386 ||  || — || February 21, 2006 || Anderson Mesa || LONEOS || — || align=right | 4.7 km || 
|-id=387 bgcolor=#d6d6d6
| 319387 ||  || — || March 2, 2006 || Kitt Peak || Spacewatch || — || align=right | 3.7 km || 
|-id=388 bgcolor=#d6d6d6
| 319388 ||  || — || March 3, 2006 || Kitt Peak || Spacewatch || — || align=right | 3.0 km || 
|-id=389 bgcolor=#E9E9E9
| 319389 ||  || — || March 3, 2006 || Mount Lemmon || Mount Lemmon Survey || HOF || align=right | 3.2 km || 
|-id=390 bgcolor=#d6d6d6
| 319390 ||  || — || March 4, 2006 || Anderson Mesa || LONEOS || ALA || align=right | 4.8 km || 
|-id=391 bgcolor=#d6d6d6
| 319391 ||  || — || March 4, 2006 || Kitt Peak || Spacewatch || EOS || align=right | 2.4 km || 
|-id=392 bgcolor=#E9E9E9
| 319392 ||  || — || March 2, 2006 || Kitt Peak || M. W. Buie || — || align=right | 1.9 km || 
|-id=393 bgcolor=#d6d6d6
| 319393 ||  || — || March 2, 2006 || Kitt Peak || M. W. Buie || — || align=right | 3.1 km || 
|-id=394 bgcolor=#d6d6d6
| 319394 ||  || — || March 4, 2006 || Catalina || CSS || Tj (2.94) || align=right | 5.0 km || 
|-id=395 bgcolor=#d6d6d6
| 319395 ||  || — || March 23, 2006 || Kitt Peak || Spacewatch || KOR || align=right | 1.4 km || 
|-id=396 bgcolor=#fefefe
| 319396 ||  || — || March 23, 2006 || Kitt Peak || Spacewatch || — || align=right data-sort-value="0.73" | 730 m || 
|-id=397 bgcolor=#fefefe
| 319397 ||  || — || April 2, 2006 || Mount Lemmon || Mount Lemmon Survey || FLO || align=right data-sort-value="0.73" | 730 m || 
|-id=398 bgcolor=#E9E9E9
| 319398 ||  || — || April 2, 2006 || Kitt Peak || Spacewatch || — || align=right | 1.5 km || 
|-id=399 bgcolor=#E9E9E9
| 319399 ||  || — || April 2, 2006 || Kitt Peak || Spacewatch || — || align=right | 2.6 km || 
|-id=400 bgcolor=#E9E9E9
| 319400 ||  || — || April 2, 2006 || Kitt Peak || Spacewatch || — || align=right | 2.3 km || 
|}

319401–319500 

|-bgcolor=#E9E9E9
| 319401 ||  || — || April 2, 2006 || Kitt Peak || Spacewatch || NEM || align=right | 3.3 km || 
|-id=402 bgcolor=#E9E9E9
| 319402 ||  || — || April 2, 2006 || Kitt Peak || Spacewatch || — || align=right | 2.1 km || 
|-id=403 bgcolor=#E9E9E9
| 319403 ||  || — || April 8, 2006 || Catalina || CSS || — || align=right | 1.4 km || 
|-id=404 bgcolor=#d6d6d6
| 319404 ||  || — || April 7, 2006 || Siding Spring || SSS || — || align=right | 5.1 km || 
|-id=405 bgcolor=#fefefe
| 319405 ||  || — || April 2, 2006 || Kitt Peak || Spacewatch || — || align=right data-sort-value="0.91" | 910 m || 
|-id=406 bgcolor=#d6d6d6
| 319406 ||  || — || April 2, 2006 || Catalina || CSS || EUP || align=right | 3.9 km || 
|-id=407 bgcolor=#d6d6d6
| 319407 ||  || — || April 19, 2006 || Kitt Peak || Spacewatch || — || align=right | 4.0 km || 
|-id=408 bgcolor=#E9E9E9
| 319408 ||  || — || April 19, 2006 || Kitt Peak || Spacewatch || — || align=right | 2.2 km || 
|-id=409 bgcolor=#E9E9E9
| 319409 ||  || — || April 23, 2006 || Mayhill || A. Lowe || — || align=right | 1.7 km || 
|-id=410 bgcolor=#d6d6d6
| 319410 ||  || — || April 19, 2006 || Mount Lemmon || Mount Lemmon Survey || — || align=right | 5.1 km || 
|-id=411 bgcolor=#fefefe
| 319411 ||  || — || April 20, 2006 || Kitt Peak || Spacewatch || — || align=right data-sort-value="0.87" | 870 m || 
|-id=412 bgcolor=#fefefe
| 319412 ||  || — || April 20, 2006 || Mount Lemmon || Mount Lemmon Survey || — || align=right data-sort-value="0.69" | 690 m || 
|-id=413 bgcolor=#fefefe
| 319413 ||  || — || April 19, 2006 || Mount Lemmon || Mount Lemmon Survey || — || align=right | 1.3 km || 
|-id=414 bgcolor=#E9E9E9
| 319414 ||  || — || April 20, 2006 || Kitt Peak || Spacewatch || — || align=right | 1.2 km || 
|-id=415 bgcolor=#d6d6d6
| 319415 ||  || — || April 21, 2006 || Kitt Peak || Spacewatch || — || align=right | 4.4 km || 
|-id=416 bgcolor=#fefefe
| 319416 ||  || — || April 21, 2006 || Kitt Peak || Spacewatch || — || align=right data-sort-value="0.72" | 720 m || 
|-id=417 bgcolor=#d6d6d6
| 319417 ||  || — || April 25, 2006 || Kitt Peak || Spacewatch || — || align=right | 3.4 km || 
|-id=418 bgcolor=#E9E9E9
| 319418 ||  || — || April 24, 2006 || Kitt Peak || Spacewatch || — || align=right | 1.6 km || 
|-id=419 bgcolor=#fefefe
| 319419 ||  || — || April 24, 2006 || Mount Lemmon || Mount Lemmon Survey || — || align=right data-sort-value="0.71" | 710 m || 
|-id=420 bgcolor=#d6d6d6
| 319420 ||  || — || April 25, 2006 || Kitt Peak || Spacewatch || — || align=right | 3.0 km || 
|-id=421 bgcolor=#FA8072
| 319421 ||  || — || April 26, 2006 || Kitt Peak || Spacewatch || — || align=right data-sort-value="0.78" | 780 m || 
|-id=422 bgcolor=#E9E9E9
| 319422 ||  || — || April 26, 2006 || Kitt Peak || Spacewatch || — || align=right | 1.5 km || 
|-id=423 bgcolor=#E9E9E9
| 319423 ||  || — || April 27, 2006 || Catalina || CSS || — || align=right | 3.6 km || 
|-id=424 bgcolor=#d6d6d6
| 319424 ||  || — || April 30, 2006 || Kitt Peak || Spacewatch || KAR || align=right | 1.3 km || 
|-id=425 bgcolor=#fefefe
| 319425 ||  || — || April 30, 2006 || Kitt Peak || Spacewatch || FLO || align=right data-sort-value="0.57" | 570 m || 
|-id=426 bgcolor=#d6d6d6
| 319426 ||  || — || April 30, 2006 || Kitt Peak || Spacewatch || KOR || align=right | 1.4 km || 
|-id=427 bgcolor=#d6d6d6
| 319427 ||  || — || April 30, 2006 || Kitt Peak || Spacewatch || 3:2 || align=right | 5.8 km || 
|-id=428 bgcolor=#d6d6d6
| 319428 ||  || — || April 30, 2006 || Kitt Peak || Spacewatch || TIR || align=right | 3.4 km || 
|-id=429 bgcolor=#E9E9E9
| 319429 ||  || — || April 30, 2006 || Kitt Peak || Spacewatch || — || align=right | 1.4 km || 
|-id=430 bgcolor=#d6d6d6
| 319430 ||  || — || April 26, 2006 || Cerro Tololo || M. W. Buie || 3:2 || align=right | 7.9 km || 
|-id=431 bgcolor=#d6d6d6
| 319431 ||  || — || May 1, 2006 || Kitt Peak || Spacewatch || — || align=right | 7.2 km || 
|-id=432 bgcolor=#fefefe
| 319432 ||  || — || May 1, 2006 || Kitt Peak || Spacewatch || — || align=right data-sort-value="0.78" | 780 m || 
|-id=433 bgcolor=#E9E9E9
| 319433 ||  || — || May 2, 2006 || Mount Lemmon || Mount Lemmon Survey || — || align=right | 1.2 km || 
|-id=434 bgcolor=#E9E9E9
| 319434 ||  || — || May 6, 2006 || Mount Lemmon || Mount Lemmon Survey || HEN || align=right | 1.1 km || 
|-id=435 bgcolor=#d6d6d6
| 319435 ||  || — || May 10, 2006 || Palomar || NEAT || — || align=right | 4.3 km || 
|-id=436 bgcolor=#fefefe
| 319436 ||  || — || May 2, 2006 || Mount Lemmon || Mount Lemmon Survey || — || align=right data-sort-value="0.86" | 860 m || 
|-id=437 bgcolor=#E9E9E9
| 319437 ||  || — || May 1, 2006 || Kitt Peak || Spacewatch || MRX || align=right | 1.3 km || 
|-id=438 bgcolor=#E9E9E9
| 319438 ||  || — || May 17, 2006 || Siding Spring || SSS || — || align=right | 3.0 km || 
|-id=439 bgcolor=#d6d6d6
| 319439 ||  || — || May 19, 2006 || Mount Lemmon || Mount Lemmon Survey || 3:2 || align=right | 5.3 km || 
|-id=440 bgcolor=#fefefe
| 319440 ||  || — || May 20, 2006 || Kitt Peak || Spacewatch || — || align=right data-sort-value="0.75" | 750 m || 
|-id=441 bgcolor=#fefefe
| 319441 ||  || — || May 21, 2006 || Kitt Peak || Spacewatch || — || align=right data-sort-value="0.61" | 610 m || 
|-id=442 bgcolor=#E9E9E9
| 319442 ||  || — || May 21, 2006 || Kitt Peak || Spacewatch || NEM || align=right | 2.9 km || 
|-id=443 bgcolor=#d6d6d6
| 319443 ||  || — || May 22, 2006 || Kitt Peak || Spacewatch || — || align=right | 4.0 km || 
|-id=444 bgcolor=#fefefe
| 319444 ||  || — || May 22, 2006 || Kitt Peak || Spacewatch || — || align=right data-sort-value="0.65" | 650 m || 
|-id=445 bgcolor=#E9E9E9
| 319445 ||  || — || May 22, 2006 || Kitt Peak || Spacewatch || — || align=right | 2.1 km || 
|-id=446 bgcolor=#E9E9E9
| 319446 ||  || — || May 23, 2006 || Mount Lemmon || Mount Lemmon Survey || GEF || align=right | 1.6 km || 
|-id=447 bgcolor=#d6d6d6
| 319447 ||  || — || May 24, 2006 || Kitt Peak || Spacewatch || SAN || align=right | 1.9 km || 
|-id=448 bgcolor=#fefefe
| 319448 ||  || — || May 24, 2006 || Kitt Peak || Spacewatch || — || align=right data-sort-value="0.76" | 760 m || 
|-id=449 bgcolor=#E9E9E9
| 319449 ||  || — || May 22, 2006 || Kitt Peak || Spacewatch || — || align=right | 1.9 km || 
|-id=450 bgcolor=#E9E9E9
| 319450 ||  || — || May 22, 2006 || Kitt Peak || Spacewatch || — || align=right | 1.9 km || 
|-id=451 bgcolor=#E9E9E9
| 319451 ||  || — || May 24, 2006 || Kitt Peak || Spacewatch || INO || align=right | 1.6 km || 
|-id=452 bgcolor=#E9E9E9
| 319452 ||  || — || May 24, 2006 || Mount Lemmon || Mount Lemmon Survey || — || align=right | 2.1 km || 
|-id=453 bgcolor=#fefefe
| 319453 ||  || — || May 25, 2006 || Palomar || NEAT || — || align=right data-sort-value="0.85" | 850 m || 
|-id=454 bgcolor=#d6d6d6
| 319454 ||  || — || May 29, 2006 || Kitt Peak || Spacewatch || K-2 || align=right | 1.6 km || 
|-id=455 bgcolor=#E9E9E9
| 319455 ||  || — || May 25, 2006 || Mauna Kea || P. A. Wiegert || — || align=right | 2.7 km || 
|-id=456 bgcolor=#fefefe
| 319456 ||  || — || May 26, 2006 || Mount Lemmon || Mount Lemmon Survey || NYS || align=right data-sort-value="0.97" | 970 m || 
|-id=457 bgcolor=#d6d6d6
| 319457 ||  || — || May 26, 2006 || Mount Lemmon || Mount Lemmon Survey || — || align=right | 4.5 km || 
|-id=458 bgcolor=#FA8072
| 319458 ||  || — || June 2, 2006 || Kitt Peak || Spacewatch || — || align=right data-sort-value="0.76" | 760 m || 
|-id=459 bgcolor=#fefefe
| 319459 ||  || — || June 18, 2006 || Palomar || NEAT || NYS || align=right data-sort-value="0.84" | 840 m || 
|-id=460 bgcolor=#fefefe
| 319460 || 2006 NJ || — || July 3, 2006 || Hibiscus || S. F. Hönig || NYS || align=right data-sort-value="0.65" | 650 m || 
|-id=461 bgcolor=#fefefe
| 319461 ||  || — || July 19, 2006 || Palomar || NEAT || — || align=right | 1.6 km || 
|-id=462 bgcolor=#fefefe
| 319462 ||  || — || July 21, 2006 || Mount Lemmon || Mount Lemmon Survey || — || align=right | 1.0 km || 
|-id=463 bgcolor=#d6d6d6
| 319463 ||  || — || July 24, 2006 || Pla D'Arguines || R. Ferrando || EOS || align=right | 2.7 km || 
|-id=464 bgcolor=#d6d6d6
| 319464 ||  || — || July 24, 2006 || Altschwendt || W. Ries || THM || align=right | 3.1 km || 
|-id=465 bgcolor=#fefefe
| 319465 ||  || — || July 21, 2006 || Socorro || LINEAR || ERI || align=right | 1.8 km || 
|-id=466 bgcolor=#E9E9E9
| 319466 ||  || — || July 21, 2006 || Catalina || CSS || — || align=right | 2.3 km || 
|-id=467 bgcolor=#fefefe
| 319467 ||  || — || May 4, 2006 || Mount Lemmon || Mount Lemmon Survey || — || align=right data-sort-value="0.77" | 770 m || 
|-id=468 bgcolor=#fefefe
| 319468 ||  || — || August 11, 2006 || Palomar || NEAT || — || align=right data-sort-value="0.86" | 860 m || 
|-id=469 bgcolor=#d6d6d6
| 319469 ||  || — || August 12, 2006 || Palomar || NEAT || EOS || align=right | 2.3 km || 
|-id=470 bgcolor=#E9E9E9
| 319470 ||  || — || August 12, 2006 || Palomar || NEAT || — || align=right data-sort-value="0.82" | 820 m || 
|-id=471 bgcolor=#fefefe
| 319471 ||  || — || August 12, 2006 || Palomar || NEAT || — || align=right | 1.1 km || 
|-id=472 bgcolor=#fefefe
| 319472 ||  || — || August 13, 2006 || Palomar || NEAT || ERI || align=right | 1.6 km || 
|-id=473 bgcolor=#fefefe
| 319473 ||  || — || August 14, 2006 || Siding Spring || SSS || V || align=right data-sort-value="0.72" | 720 m || 
|-id=474 bgcolor=#E9E9E9
| 319474 ||  || — || August 15, 2006 || Palomar || NEAT || — || align=right | 2.1 km || 
|-id=475 bgcolor=#fefefe
| 319475 ||  || — || August 15, 2006 || Palomar || NEAT || — || align=right | 1.0 km || 
|-id=476 bgcolor=#fefefe
| 319476 ||  || — || August 15, 2006 || Palomar || NEAT || H || align=right data-sort-value="0.83" | 830 m || 
|-id=477 bgcolor=#FA8072
| 319477 ||  || — || August 15, 2006 || Palomar || NEAT || — || align=right | 1.1 km || 
|-id=478 bgcolor=#E9E9E9
| 319478 ||  || — || August 12, 2006 || Lulin Observatory || H.-C. Lin, Q.-z. Ye || — || align=right data-sort-value="0.91" | 910 m || 
|-id=479 bgcolor=#fefefe
| 319479 ||  || — || August 15, 2006 || Lulin || C.-S. Lin, Q.-z. Ye || — || align=right data-sort-value="0.78" | 780 m || 
|-id=480 bgcolor=#fefefe
| 319480 ||  || — || August 16, 2006 || Siding Spring || SSS || — || align=right data-sort-value="0.91" | 910 m || 
|-id=481 bgcolor=#fefefe
| 319481 ||  || — || August 19, 2006 || Palomar || NEAT || — || align=right | 1.0 km || 
|-id=482 bgcolor=#fefefe
| 319482 ||  || — || August 16, 2006 || Siding Spring || SSS || — || align=right data-sort-value="0.77" | 770 m || 
|-id=483 bgcolor=#fefefe
| 319483 ||  || — || August 17, 2006 || Palomar || NEAT || MAS || align=right data-sort-value="0.82" | 820 m || 
|-id=484 bgcolor=#fefefe
| 319484 ||  || — || August 16, 2006 || Palomar || NEAT || ERI || align=right | 1.5 km || 
|-id=485 bgcolor=#fefefe
| 319485 ||  || — || August 17, 2006 || Palomar || NEAT || FLO || align=right data-sort-value="0.76" | 760 m || 
|-id=486 bgcolor=#fefefe
| 319486 ||  || — || August 18, 2006 || Anderson Mesa || LONEOS || — || align=right data-sort-value="0.95" | 950 m || 
|-id=487 bgcolor=#fefefe
| 319487 ||  || — || August 19, 2006 || Anderson Mesa || LONEOS || — || align=right | 1.3 km || 
|-id=488 bgcolor=#fefefe
| 319488 ||  || — || August 17, 2006 || Palomar || NEAT || — || align=right data-sort-value="0.98" | 980 m || 
|-id=489 bgcolor=#fefefe
| 319489 ||  || — || August 21, 2006 || Kitt Peak || Spacewatch || V || align=right data-sort-value="0.79" | 790 m || 
|-id=490 bgcolor=#E9E9E9
| 319490 ||  || — || August 20, 2006 || Palomar || NEAT || — || align=right | 2.2 km || 
|-id=491 bgcolor=#fefefe
| 319491 ||  || — || May 20, 2001 || Cerro Tololo || M. W. Buie || — || align=right | 1.2 km || 
|-id=492 bgcolor=#fefefe
| 319492 ||  || — || August 19, 2006 || Anderson Mesa || LONEOS || — || align=right data-sort-value="0.96" | 960 m || 
|-id=493 bgcolor=#E9E9E9
| 319493 ||  || — || August 19, 2006 || Kitt Peak || Spacewatch || — || align=right data-sort-value="0.88" | 880 m || 
|-id=494 bgcolor=#fefefe
| 319494 ||  || — || August 21, 2006 || Palomar || NEAT || FLO || align=right data-sort-value="0.91" | 910 m || 
|-id=495 bgcolor=#FA8072
| 319495 ||  || — || August 19, 2006 || Palomar || NEAT || — || align=right data-sort-value="0.92" | 920 m || 
|-id=496 bgcolor=#fefefe
| 319496 ||  || — || August 24, 2006 || Socorro || LINEAR || V || align=right data-sort-value="0.78" | 780 m || 
|-id=497 bgcolor=#fefefe
| 319497 ||  || — || August 21, 2006 || Kitt Peak || Spacewatch || V || align=right data-sort-value="0.67" | 670 m || 
|-id=498 bgcolor=#fefefe
| 319498 ||  || — || August 24, 2006 || Socorro || LINEAR || — || align=right | 1.1 km || 
|-id=499 bgcolor=#fefefe
| 319499 ||  || — || August 24, 2006 || Palomar || NEAT || — || align=right | 1.3 km || 
|-id=500 bgcolor=#fefefe
| 319500 ||  || — || August 24, 2006 || Palomar || NEAT || NYS || align=right data-sort-value="0.73" | 730 m || 
|}

319501–319600 

|-bgcolor=#fefefe
| 319501 ||  || — || August 16, 2006 || Palomar || NEAT || FLO || align=right data-sort-value="0.64" | 640 m || 
|-id=502 bgcolor=#d6d6d6
| 319502 ||  || — || August 16, 2006 || Palomar || NEAT || TIR || align=right | 4.6 km || 
|-id=503 bgcolor=#d6d6d6
| 319503 ||  || — || August 26, 2006 || Socorro || LINEAR || EUP || align=right | 6.4 km || 
|-id=504 bgcolor=#fefefe
| 319504 ||  || — || August 24, 2006 || Palomar || NEAT || — || align=right data-sort-value="0.86" | 860 m || 
|-id=505 bgcolor=#fefefe
| 319505 ||  || — || August 27, 2006 || Anderson Mesa || LONEOS || NYS || align=right data-sort-value="0.75" | 750 m || 
|-id=506 bgcolor=#fefefe
| 319506 ||  || — || August 29, 2006 || Catalina || CSS || PHO || align=right | 2.1 km || 
|-id=507 bgcolor=#fefefe
| 319507 ||  || — || August 24, 2006 || Socorro || LINEAR || — || align=right | 1.2 km || 
|-id=508 bgcolor=#E9E9E9
| 319508 ||  || — || August 16, 2006 || Palomar || NEAT || — || align=right | 1.2 km || 
|-id=509 bgcolor=#fefefe
| 319509 ||  || — || August 31, 2006 || Schiaparelli || Schiaparelli Obs. || V || align=right data-sort-value="0.80" | 800 m || 
|-id=510 bgcolor=#E9E9E9
| 319510 ||  || — || August 29, 2006 || Catalina || CSS || — || align=right | 2.2 km || 
|-id=511 bgcolor=#E9E9E9
| 319511 ||  || — || August 18, 2006 || Kitt Peak || Spacewatch || — || align=right data-sort-value="0.90" | 900 m || 
|-id=512 bgcolor=#fefefe
| 319512 ||  || — || August 18, 2006 || Kitt Peak || Spacewatch || — || align=right data-sort-value="0.80" | 800 m || 
|-id=513 bgcolor=#E9E9E9
| 319513 ||  || — || August 18, 2006 || Kitt Peak || Spacewatch || — || align=right | 1.3 km || 
|-id=514 bgcolor=#d6d6d6
| 319514 ||  || — || August 19, 2006 || Kitt Peak || Spacewatch || THM || align=right | 2.4 km || 
|-id=515 bgcolor=#E9E9E9
| 319515 ||  || — || August 29, 2006 || Catalina || CSS || — || align=right data-sort-value="0.95" | 950 m || 
|-id=516 bgcolor=#E9E9E9
| 319516 ||  || — || August 28, 2006 || Anderson Mesa || LONEOS || — || align=right | 1.9 km || 
|-id=517 bgcolor=#E9E9E9
| 319517 ||  || — || August 28, 2006 || Catalina || CSS || EUN || align=right | 1.6 km || 
|-id=518 bgcolor=#fefefe
| 319518 ||  || — || August 18, 2006 || Kitt Peak || Spacewatch || — || align=right data-sort-value="0.89" | 890 m || 
|-id=519 bgcolor=#d6d6d6
| 319519 || 2006 RJ || — || September 1, 2006 || Plana || F. Fratev || — || align=right | 3.2 km || 
|-id=520 bgcolor=#fefefe
| 319520 ||  || — || September 13, 2006 || Palomar || NEAT || — || align=right data-sort-value="0.74" | 740 m || 
|-id=521 bgcolor=#E9E9E9
| 319521 ||  || — || September 15, 2006 || Catalina || CSS || — || align=right | 1.8 km || 
|-id=522 bgcolor=#E9E9E9
| 319522 ||  || — || September 15, 2006 || Palomar || NEAT || — || align=right | 2.5 km || 
|-id=523 bgcolor=#fefefe
| 319523 ||  || — || September 14, 2006 || Catalina || CSS || V || align=right data-sort-value="0.77" | 770 m || 
|-id=524 bgcolor=#E9E9E9
| 319524 ||  || — || September 14, 2006 || Kitt Peak || Spacewatch || — || align=right | 1.5 km || 
|-id=525 bgcolor=#E9E9E9
| 319525 ||  || — || September 14, 2006 || Kitt Peak || Spacewatch || — || align=right | 1.1 km || 
|-id=526 bgcolor=#E9E9E9
| 319526 ||  || — || September 14, 2006 || Kitt Peak || Spacewatch || — || align=right data-sort-value="0.90" | 900 m || 
|-id=527 bgcolor=#d6d6d6
| 319527 ||  || — || September 14, 2006 || Kitt Peak || Spacewatch || — || align=right | 3.8 km || 
|-id=528 bgcolor=#E9E9E9
| 319528 ||  || — || September 14, 2006 || Kitt Peak || Spacewatch || — || align=right | 1.9 km || 
|-id=529 bgcolor=#d6d6d6
| 319529 ||  || — || September 14, 2006 || Kitt Peak || Spacewatch || HYG || align=right | 3.9 km || 
|-id=530 bgcolor=#E9E9E9
| 319530 ||  || — || September 14, 2006 || Kitt Peak || Spacewatch || — || align=right | 1.1 km || 
|-id=531 bgcolor=#E9E9E9
| 319531 ||  || — || September 14, 2006 || Kitt Peak || Spacewatch || JUN || align=right | 1.3 km || 
|-id=532 bgcolor=#E9E9E9
| 319532 ||  || — || September 14, 2006 || Palomar || NEAT || CLO || align=right | 3.0 km || 
|-id=533 bgcolor=#E9E9E9
| 319533 ||  || — || September 15, 2006 || Kitt Peak || Spacewatch || — || align=right | 1.4 km || 
|-id=534 bgcolor=#E9E9E9
| 319534 ||  || — || September 14, 2006 || Catalina || CSS || — || align=right | 1.5 km || 
|-id=535 bgcolor=#d6d6d6
| 319535 ||  || — || September 14, 2006 || Catalina || CSS || — || align=right | 3.3 km || 
|-id=536 bgcolor=#E9E9E9
| 319536 ||  || — || September 15, 2006 || Kitt Peak || Spacewatch || — || align=right data-sort-value="0.74" | 740 m || 
|-id=537 bgcolor=#d6d6d6
| 319537 ||  || — || September 15, 2006 || Kitt Peak || Spacewatch || — || align=right | 3.1 km || 
|-id=538 bgcolor=#d6d6d6
| 319538 ||  || — || September 15, 2006 || Kitt Peak || Spacewatch || — || align=right | 2.5 km || 
|-id=539 bgcolor=#fefefe
| 319539 ||  || — || September 15, 2006 || Kitt Peak || Spacewatch || — || align=right data-sort-value="0.89" | 890 m || 
|-id=540 bgcolor=#fefefe
| 319540 ||  || — || September 15, 2006 || Kitt Peak || Spacewatch || — || align=right data-sort-value="0.82" | 820 m || 
|-id=541 bgcolor=#fefefe
| 319541 ||  || — || September 15, 2006 || Kitt Peak || Spacewatch || CIM || align=right | 2.2 km || 
|-id=542 bgcolor=#fefefe
| 319542 ||  || — || September 15, 2006 || Kitt Peak || Spacewatch || — || align=right data-sort-value="0.91" | 910 m || 
|-id=543 bgcolor=#E9E9E9
| 319543 ||  || — || February 29, 2004 || Kitt Peak || Spacewatch || — || align=right | 1.6 km || 
|-id=544 bgcolor=#E9E9E9
| 319544 ||  || — || September 15, 2006 || Kitt Peak || Spacewatch || MIS || align=right | 2.4 km || 
|-id=545 bgcolor=#fefefe
| 319545 ||  || — || September 15, 2006 || Kitt Peak || Spacewatch || NYS || align=right data-sort-value="0.85" | 850 m || 
|-id=546 bgcolor=#fefefe
| 319546 ||  || — || September 15, 2006 || Kitt Peak || Spacewatch || NYS || align=right data-sort-value="0.76" | 760 m || 
|-id=547 bgcolor=#fefefe
| 319547 ||  || — || September 11, 2006 || Apache Point || A. C. Becker || — || align=right data-sort-value="0.97" | 970 m || 
|-id=548 bgcolor=#fefefe
| 319548 ||  || — || September 15, 2006 || Kitt Peak || Spacewatch || — || align=right data-sort-value="0.97" | 970 m || 
|-id=549 bgcolor=#fefefe
| 319549 ||  || — || September 14, 2006 || Mauna Kea || J. Masiero || MAS || align=right data-sort-value="0.68" | 680 m || 
|-id=550 bgcolor=#fefefe
| 319550 ||  || — || September 14, 2006 || Mauna Kea || J. Masiero || NYS || align=right data-sort-value="0.65" | 650 m || 
|-id=551 bgcolor=#fefefe
| 319551 ||  || — || September 14, 2006 || Mauna Kea || J. Masiero || NYS || align=right data-sort-value="0.72" | 720 m || 
|-id=552 bgcolor=#fefefe
| 319552 ||  || — || September 14, 2006 || Kitt Peak || Spacewatch || — || align=right data-sort-value="0.93" | 930 m || 
|-id=553 bgcolor=#fefefe
| 319553 ||  || — || July 22, 2006 || Mount Lemmon || Mount Lemmon Survey || — || align=right | 1.2 km || 
|-id=554 bgcolor=#E9E9E9
| 319554 ||  || — || September 17, 2006 || Catalina || CSS || HNS || align=right | 1.1 km || 
|-id=555 bgcolor=#fefefe
| 319555 ||  || — || September 17, 2006 || Catalina || CSS || FLO || align=right data-sort-value="0.85" | 850 m || 
|-id=556 bgcolor=#E9E9E9
| 319556 ||  || — || September 18, 2006 || Calvin-Rehoboth || Calvin–Rehoboth Obs. || BRG || align=right | 1.3 km || 
|-id=557 bgcolor=#fefefe
| 319557 ||  || — || September 17, 2006 || Kitt Peak || Spacewatch || — || align=right data-sort-value="0.81" | 810 m || 
|-id=558 bgcolor=#E9E9E9
| 319558 ||  || — || September 17, 2006 || Catalina || CSS || — || align=right | 1.7 km || 
|-id=559 bgcolor=#fefefe
| 319559 ||  || — || September 17, 2006 || Catalina || CSS || NYS || align=right data-sort-value="0.78" | 780 m || 
|-id=560 bgcolor=#E9E9E9
| 319560 ||  || — || September 17, 2006 || Anderson Mesa || LONEOS || — || align=right | 1.9 km || 
|-id=561 bgcolor=#fefefe
| 319561 ||  || — || September 18, 2006 || Socorro || LINEAR || V || align=right data-sort-value="0.68" | 680 m || 
|-id=562 bgcolor=#E9E9E9
| 319562 ||  || — || September 18, 2006 || Catalina || CSS || JUN || align=right | 1.6 km || 
|-id=563 bgcolor=#fefefe
| 319563 ||  || — || September 17, 2006 || Catalina || CSS || — || align=right | 1.3 km || 
|-id=564 bgcolor=#E9E9E9
| 319564 ||  || — || August 28, 2006 || Catalina || CSS || — || align=right | 1.2 km || 
|-id=565 bgcolor=#E9E9E9
| 319565 ||  || — || September 17, 2006 || Anderson Mesa || LONEOS || — || align=right | 2.1 km || 
|-id=566 bgcolor=#fefefe
| 319566 ||  || — || September 19, 2006 || Catalina || CSS || — || align=right data-sort-value="0.88" | 880 m || 
|-id=567 bgcolor=#fefefe
| 319567 ||  || — || September 18, 2006 || Anderson Mesa || LONEOS || — || align=right | 1.2 km || 
|-id=568 bgcolor=#fefefe
| 319568 ||  || — || September 19, 2006 || Kitt Peak || Spacewatch || — || align=right | 1.1 km || 
|-id=569 bgcolor=#fefefe
| 319569 ||  || — || September 18, 2006 || Kitt Peak || Spacewatch || — || align=right data-sort-value="0.90" | 900 m || 
|-id=570 bgcolor=#fefefe
| 319570 ||  || — || September 18, 2006 || Kitt Peak || Spacewatch || — || align=right | 1.2 km || 
|-id=571 bgcolor=#E9E9E9
| 319571 ||  || — || September 18, 2006 || Kitt Peak || Spacewatch || — || align=right data-sort-value="0.75" | 750 m || 
|-id=572 bgcolor=#E9E9E9
| 319572 ||  || — || September 18, 2006 || Kitt Peak || Spacewatch || — || align=right | 1.3 km || 
|-id=573 bgcolor=#E9E9E9
| 319573 ||  || — || September 18, 2006 || Kitt Peak || Spacewatch || — || align=right data-sort-value="0.82" | 820 m || 
|-id=574 bgcolor=#fefefe
| 319574 ||  || — || September 18, 2006 || Kitt Peak || Spacewatch || V || align=right data-sort-value="0.65" | 650 m || 
|-id=575 bgcolor=#fefefe
| 319575 ||  || — || September 18, 2006 || Kitt Peak || Spacewatch || — || align=right | 1.00 km || 
|-id=576 bgcolor=#E9E9E9
| 319576 ||  || — || September 18, 2006 || Kitt Peak || Spacewatch || — || align=right | 1.1 km || 
|-id=577 bgcolor=#E9E9E9
| 319577 ||  || — || September 18, 2006 || Kitt Peak || Spacewatch || MIS || align=right | 2.4 km || 
|-id=578 bgcolor=#fefefe
| 319578 ||  || — || September 18, 2006 || Kitt Peak || Spacewatch || NYS || align=right data-sort-value="0.73" | 730 m || 
|-id=579 bgcolor=#E9E9E9
| 319579 ||  || — || September 18, 2006 || Kitt Peak || Spacewatch || HNS || align=right | 1.2 km || 
|-id=580 bgcolor=#fefefe
| 319580 ||  || — || September 19, 2006 || Kitt Peak || Spacewatch || MAS || align=right data-sort-value="0.78" | 780 m || 
|-id=581 bgcolor=#d6d6d6
| 319581 ||  || — || September 19, 2006 || Catalina || CSS || — || align=right | 3.4 km || 
|-id=582 bgcolor=#E9E9E9
| 319582 ||  || — || September 19, 2006 || Kitt Peak || Spacewatch || EUN || align=right | 1.4 km || 
|-id=583 bgcolor=#E9E9E9
| 319583 ||  || — || September 24, 2006 || Anderson Mesa || LONEOS || — || align=right | 2.0 km || 
|-id=584 bgcolor=#E9E9E9
| 319584 ||  || — || September 18, 2006 || Catalina || CSS || — || align=right | 1.7 km || 
|-id=585 bgcolor=#E9E9E9
| 319585 ||  || — || September 18, 2006 || Catalina || CSS || ADE || align=right | 1.9 km || 
|-id=586 bgcolor=#E9E9E9
| 319586 ||  || — || September 19, 2006 || Anderson Mesa || LONEOS || — || align=right | 3.8 km || 
|-id=587 bgcolor=#fefefe
| 319587 ||  || — || September 20, 2006 || Palomar || NEAT || — || align=right | 1.8 km || 
|-id=588 bgcolor=#fefefe
| 319588 ||  || — || September 20, 2006 || Anderson Mesa || LONEOS || — || align=right | 1.1 km || 
|-id=589 bgcolor=#E9E9E9
| 319589 ||  || — || September 19, 2006 || Kitt Peak || Spacewatch || — || align=right data-sort-value="0.79" | 790 m || 
|-id=590 bgcolor=#E9E9E9
| 319590 ||  || — || September 23, 2006 || Kitt Peak || Spacewatch || — || align=right | 1.5 km || 
|-id=591 bgcolor=#FA8072
| 319591 ||  || — || September 24, 2006 || Kitt Peak || Spacewatch || — || align=right data-sort-value="0.65" | 650 m || 
|-id=592 bgcolor=#d6d6d6
| 319592 ||  || — || September 25, 2006 || Kitt Peak || Spacewatch || EOS || align=right | 5.1 km || 
|-id=593 bgcolor=#E9E9E9
| 319593 ||  || — || September 25, 2006 || Kitt Peak || Spacewatch || RAF || align=right data-sort-value="0.92" | 920 m || 
|-id=594 bgcolor=#fefefe
| 319594 ||  || — || September 25, 2006 || Socorro || LINEAR || V || align=right data-sort-value="0.85" | 850 m || 
|-id=595 bgcolor=#d6d6d6
| 319595 ||  || — || September 25, 2006 || Kitt Peak || Spacewatch || THM || align=right | 2.7 km || 
|-id=596 bgcolor=#E9E9E9
| 319596 ||  || — || September 25, 2006 || Kitt Peak || Spacewatch || — || align=right | 1.0 km || 
|-id=597 bgcolor=#fefefe
| 319597 ||  || — || September 25, 2006 || Kitt Peak || Spacewatch || — || align=right data-sort-value="0.96" | 960 m || 
|-id=598 bgcolor=#fefefe
| 319598 ||  || — || September 25, 2006 || Kitt Peak || Spacewatch || EUT || align=right data-sort-value="0.70" | 700 m || 
|-id=599 bgcolor=#fefefe
| 319599 ||  || — || September 26, 2006 || Kitt Peak || Spacewatch || MAS || align=right data-sort-value="0.75" | 750 m || 
|-id=600 bgcolor=#d6d6d6
| 319600 ||  || — || September 26, 2006 || Mount Lemmon || Mount Lemmon Survey || — || align=right | 3.6 km || 
|}

319601–319700 

|-bgcolor=#E9E9E9
| 319601 ||  || — || September 25, 2006 || Moletai || Molėtai Obs. || — || align=right | 1.0 km || 
|-id=602 bgcolor=#fefefe
| 319602 ||  || — || September 24, 2006 || Kitt Peak || Spacewatch || — || align=right | 1.0 km || 
|-id=603 bgcolor=#E9E9E9
| 319603 ||  || — || September 24, 2006 || Kitt Peak || Spacewatch || — || align=right | 1.0 km || 
|-id=604 bgcolor=#d6d6d6
| 319604 ||  || — || September 26, 2006 || Catalina || CSS || EOS || align=right | 5.6 km || 
|-id=605 bgcolor=#E9E9E9
| 319605 ||  || — || September 28, 2006 || Kitt Peak || Spacewatch || — || align=right data-sort-value="0.93" | 930 m || 
|-id=606 bgcolor=#fefefe
| 319606 ||  || — || September 26, 2006 || Kitt Peak || Spacewatch || FLO || align=right data-sort-value="0.73" | 730 m || 
|-id=607 bgcolor=#fefefe
| 319607 ||  || — || September 26, 2006 || Kitt Peak || Spacewatch || SUL || align=right | 2.0 km || 
|-id=608 bgcolor=#fefefe
| 319608 ||  || — || September 26, 2006 || Mount Lemmon || Mount Lemmon Survey || — || align=right data-sort-value="0.94" | 940 m || 
|-id=609 bgcolor=#d6d6d6
| 319609 ||  || — || September 26, 2006 || Kitt Peak || Spacewatch || — || align=right | 2.7 km || 
|-id=610 bgcolor=#E9E9E9
| 319610 ||  || — || September 26, 2006 || Mount Lemmon || Mount Lemmon Survey || — || align=right data-sort-value="0.86" | 860 m || 
|-id=611 bgcolor=#d6d6d6
| 319611 ||  || — || September 26, 2006 || Mount Lemmon || Mount Lemmon Survey || — || align=right | 3.4 km || 
|-id=612 bgcolor=#d6d6d6
| 319612 ||  || — || September 26, 2006 || Kitt Peak || Spacewatch || HYG || align=right | 2.9 km || 
|-id=613 bgcolor=#fefefe
| 319613 ||  || — || September 26, 2006 || Kitt Peak || Spacewatch || — || align=right data-sort-value="0.90" | 900 m || 
|-id=614 bgcolor=#E9E9E9
| 319614 ||  || — || September 27, 2006 || Mount Lemmon || Mount Lemmon Survey || — || align=right | 1.0 km || 
|-id=615 bgcolor=#E9E9E9
| 319615 ||  || — || September 28, 2006 || Socorro || LINEAR || — || align=right | 1.1 km || 
|-id=616 bgcolor=#fefefe
| 319616 ||  || — || September 28, 2006 || Kitt Peak || Spacewatch || V || align=right data-sort-value="0.85" | 850 m || 
|-id=617 bgcolor=#E9E9E9
| 319617 ||  || — || September 28, 2006 || Catalina || CSS || JUN || align=right | 1.3 km || 
|-id=618 bgcolor=#fefefe
| 319618 ||  || — || September 29, 2006 || Anderson Mesa || LONEOS || NYS || align=right | 1.0 km || 
|-id=619 bgcolor=#fefefe
| 319619 ||  || — || September 29, 2006 || Anderson Mesa || LONEOS || — || align=right | 1.2 km || 
|-id=620 bgcolor=#E9E9E9
| 319620 ||  || — || September 26, 2006 || Catalina || CSS || — || align=right | 1.3 km || 
|-id=621 bgcolor=#E9E9E9
| 319621 ||  || — || September 25, 2006 || Kitt Peak || Spacewatch || — || align=right | 1.1 km || 
|-id=622 bgcolor=#E9E9E9
| 319622 ||  || — || September 26, 2006 || Catalina || CSS || — || align=right | 1.9 km || 
|-id=623 bgcolor=#E9E9E9
| 319623 ||  || — || September 27, 2006 || Mount Lemmon || Mount Lemmon Survey || — || align=right data-sort-value="0.87" | 870 m || 
|-id=624 bgcolor=#fefefe
| 319624 ||  || — || September 27, 2006 || Mount Lemmon || Mount Lemmon Survey || NYS || align=right data-sort-value="0.87" | 870 m || 
|-id=625 bgcolor=#E9E9E9
| 319625 ||  || — || September 27, 2006 || Kitt Peak || Spacewatch || — || align=right | 1.2 km || 
|-id=626 bgcolor=#fefefe
| 319626 ||  || — || September 27, 2006 || Kitt Peak || Spacewatch || NYS || align=right data-sort-value="0.71" | 710 m || 
|-id=627 bgcolor=#fefefe
| 319627 ||  || — || September 28, 2006 || Mount Lemmon || Mount Lemmon Survey || NYS || align=right data-sort-value="0.88" | 880 m || 
|-id=628 bgcolor=#E9E9E9
| 319628 ||  || — || September 28, 2006 || Kitt Peak || Spacewatch || — || align=right | 1.4 km || 
|-id=629 bgcolor=#E9E9E9
| 319629 ||  || — || September 30, 2006 || Catalina || CSS || GEF || align=right | 1.5 km || 
|-id=630 bgcolor=#fefefe
| 319630 ||  || — || September 30, 2006 || Catalina || CSS || — || align=right | 1.3 km || 
|-id=631 bgcolor=#E9E9E9
| 319631 ||  || — || September 30, 2006 || Mount Lemmon || Mount Lemmon Survey || — || align=right | 1.3 km || 
|-id=632 bgcolor=#E9E9E9
| 319632 ||  || — || September 30, 2006 || Mount Lemmon || Mount Lemmon Survey || JUN || align=right data-sort-value="0.97" | 970 m || 
|-id=633 bgcolor=#E9E9E9
| 319633 ||  || — || September 30, 2006 || Mount Lemmon || Mount Lemmon Survey || — || align=right | 1.9 km || 
|-id=634 bgcolor=#E9E9E9
| 319634 ||  || — || September 16, 2006 || Catalina || CSS || KON || align=right | 2.4 km || 
|-id=635 bgcolor=#E9E9E9
| 319635 ||  || — || September 25, 2006 || Catalina || CSS || EUN || align=right | 1.6 km || 
|-id=636 bgcolor=#E9E9E9
| 319636 ||  || — || September 23, 2006 || Moletai || Molėtai Obs. || — || align=right | 3.5 km || 
|-id=637 bgcolor=#E9E9E9
| 319637 ||  || — || September 17, 2006 || Apache Point || A. C. Becker || — || align=right | 1.1 km || 
|-id=638 bgcolor=#E9E9E9
| 319638 ||  || — || September 27, 2006 || Apache Point || A. C. Becker || — || align=right | 1.3 km || 
|-id=639 bgcolor=#fefefe
| 319639 ||  || — || September 17, 2006 || Catalina || CSS || — || align=right | 1.0 km || 
|-id=640 bgcolor=#E9E9E9
| 319640 ||  || — || September 19, 2006 || Catalina || CSS || — || align=right | 1.8 km || 
|-id=641 bgcolor=#E9E9E9
| 319641 ||  || — || September 19, 2006 || Catalina || CSS || — || align=right | 2.1 km || 
|-id=642 bgcolor=#E9E9E9
| 319642 ||  || — || September 28, 2006 || Mount Lemmon || Mount Lemmon Survey || — || align=right | 1.4 km || 
|-id=643 bgcolor=#E9E9E9
| 319643 ||  || — || September 17, 2006 || Kitt Peak || Spacewatch || HEN || align=right | 1.1 km || 
|-id=644 bgcolor=#E9E9E9
| 319644 ||  || — || September 18, 2006 || Catalina || CSS || CLO || align=right | 2.2 km || 
|-id=645 bgcolor=#E9E9E9
| 319645 ||  || — || September 27, 2006 || Mount Lemmon || Mount Lemmon Survey || MAR || align=right | 1.2 km || 
|-id=646 bgcolor=#E9E9E9
| 319646 ||  || — || September 30, 2006 || Mount Lemmon || Mount Lemmon Survey || — || align=right | 1.4 km || 
|-id=647 bgcolor=#fefefe
| 319647 ||  || — || September 19, 2006 || Kitt Peak || Spacewatch || — || align=right | 1.1 km || 
|-id=648 bgcolor=#E9E9E9
| 319648 ||  || — || September 30, 2006 || Catalina || CSS || — || align=right | 2.6 km || 
|-id=649 bgcolor=#E9E9E9
| 319649 ||  || — || December 8, 2002 || Palomar || NEAT || — || align=right | 1.5 km || 
|-id=650 bgcolor=#E9E9E9
| 319650 ||  || — || September 25, 2006 || Catalina || CSS || — || align=right | 2.7 km || 
|-id=651 bgcolor=#E9E9E9
| 319651 ||  || — || October 10, 2006 || San Marcello || Pistoia Mountains Obs. || — || align=right data-sort-value="0.94" | 940 m || 
|-id=652 bgcolor=#E9E9E9
| 319652 ||  || — || October 10, 2006 || Palomar || NEAT || — || align=right | 2.0 km || 
|-id=653 bgcolor=#E9E9E9
| 319653 ||  || — || October 10, 2006 || Palomar || NEAT || JUN || align=right data-sort-value="0.99" | 990 m || 
|-id=654 bgcolor=#E9E9E9
| 319654 ||  || — || October 11, 2006 || Kitt Peak || Spacewatch || — || align=right | 1.1 km || 
|-id=655 bgcolor=#E9E9E9
| 319655 ||  || — || October 11, 2006 || Kitt Peak || Spacewatch || HNS || align=right | 1.4 km || 
|-id=656 bgcolor=#d6d6d6
| 319656 ||  || — || October 12, 2006 || Kitt Peak || Spacewatch || — || align=right | 5.5 km || 
|-id=657 bgcolor=#E9E9E9
| 319657 ||  || — || October 12, 2006 || Kitt Peak || Spacewatch || — || align=right data-sort-value="0.95" | 950 m || 
|-id=658 bgcolor=#E9E9E9
| 319658 ||  || — || October 12, 2006 || Kitt Peak || Spacewatch || — || align=right | 1.2 km || 
|-id=659 bgcolor=#E9E9E9
| 319659 ||  || — || October 12, 2006 || Kitt Peak || Spacewatch || — || align=right | 1.7 km || 
|-id=660 bgcolor=#E9E9E9
| 319660 ||  || — || October 12, 2006 || Kitt Peak || Spacewatch || — || align=right | 1.6 km || 
|-id=661 bgcolor=#E9E9E9
| 319661 ||  || — || October 12, 2006 || Kitt Peak || Spacewatch || — || align=right data-sort-value="0.77" | 770 m || 
|-id=662 bgcolor=#E9E9E9
| 319662 ||  || — || October 12, 2006 || Kitt Peak || Spacewatch || — || align=right | 1.9 km || 
|-id=663 bgcolor=#E9E9E9
| 319663 ||  || — || October 12, 2006 || Kitt Peak || Spacewatch || MAR || align=right | 1.6 km || 
|-id=664 bgcolor=#E9E9E9
| 319664 ||  || — || October 12, 2006 || Kitt Peak || Spacewatch || — || align=right | 1.5 km || 
|-id=665 bgcolor=#E9E9E9
| 319665 ||  || — || October 12, 2006 || Kitt Peak || Spacewatch || — || align=right data-sort-value="0.98" | 980 m || 
|-id=666 bgcolor=#fefefe
| 319666 ||  || — || October 12, 2006 || Kitt Peak || Spacewatch || — || align=right | 1.4 km || 
|-id=667 bgcolor=#E9E9E9
| 319667 ||  || — || October 12, 2006 || Kitt Peak || Spacewatch || HEN || align=right | 1.1 km || 
|-id=668 bgcolor=#E9E9E9
| 319668 ||  || — || October 12, 2006 || Kitt Peak || Spacewatch || — || align=right | 1.5 km || 
|-id=669 bgcolor=#E9E9E9
| 319669 ||  || — || October 12, 2006 || Kitt Peak || Spacewatch || — || align=right | 1.4 km || 
|-id=670 bgcolor=#fefefe
| 319670 ||  || — || October 12, 2006 || Kitt Peak || Spacewatch || — || align=right data-sort-value="0.83" | 830 m || 
|-id=671 bgcolor=#E9E9E9
| 319671 ||  || — || October 12, 2006 || Kitt Peak || Spacewatch || — || align=right | 1.6 km || 
|-id=672 bgcolor=#E9E9E9
| 319672 ||  || — || October 12, 2006 || Palomar || NEAT || MRX || align=right data-sort-value="0.90" | 900 m || 
|-id=673 bgcolor=#E9E9E9
| 319673 ||  || — || November 14, 2002 || Palomar || NEAT || RAF || align=right data-sort-value="0.98" | 980 m || 
|-id=674 bgcolor=#E9E9E9
| 319674 ||  || — || October 11, 2006 || Palomar || NEAT || MAR || align=right | 1.2 km || 
|-id=675 bgcolor=#d6d6d6
| 319675 ||  || — || October 11, 2006 || Palomar || NEAT || HYG || align=right | 3.4 km || 
|-id=676 bgcolor=#E9E9E9
| 319676 ||  || — || October 11, 2006 || Palomar || NEAT || — || align=right | 2.1 km || 
|-id=677 bgcolor=#E9E9E9
| 319677 ||  || — || October 11, 2006 || Palomar || NEAT || EUN || align=right | 1.7 km || 
|-id=678 bgcolor=#E9E9E9
| 319678 ||  || — || October 11, 2006 || Palomar || NEAT || — || align=right | 1.7 km || 
|-id=679 bgcolor=#E9E9E9
| 319679 ||  || — || October 12, 2006 || Palomar || NEAT || EUN || align=right | 1.6 km || 
|-id=680 bgcolor=#E9E9E9
| 319680 ||  || — || October 13, 2006 || Kitt Peak || Spacewatch || — || align=right | 1.2 km || 
|-id=681 bgcolor=#fefefe
| 319681 ||  || — || October 13, 2006 || Kitt Peak || Spacewatch || NYS || align=right data-sort-value="0.90" | 900 m || 
|-id=682 bgcolor=#E9E9E9
| 319682 ||  || — || October 13, 2006 || Kitt Peak || Spacewatch || — || align=right | 1.2 km || 
|-id=683 bgcolor=#fefefe
| 319683 ||  || — || October 13, 2006 || Kitt Peak || Spacewatch || — || align=right data-sort-value="0.96" | 960 m || 
|-id=684 bgcolor=#fefefe
| 319684 ||  || — || October 13, 2006 || Kitt Peak || Spacewatch || V || align=right data-sort-value="0.88" | 880 m || 
|-id=685 bgcolor=#E9E9E9
| 319685 ||  || — || October 13, 2006 || Kitt Peak || Spacewatch || — || align=right | 1.2 km || 
|-id=686 bgcolor=#E9E9E9
| 319686 ||  || — || October 15, 2006 || Kitt Peak || Spacewatch || — || align=right | 1.2 km || 
|-id=687 bgcolor=#fefefe
| 319687 ||  || — || October 15, 2006 || Lulin Observatory || C.-S. Lin, Q.-z. Ye || — || align=right | 1.2 km || 
|-id=688 bgcolor=#fefefe
| 319688 ||  || — || October 3, 2006 || Siding Spring || SSS || H || align=right data-sort-value="0.76" | 760 m || 
|-id=689 bgcolor=#E9E9E9
| 319689 ||  || — || October 15, 2006 || Kitt Peak || Spacewatch || — || align=right | 1.0 km || 
|-id=690 bgcolor=#fefefe
| 319690 ||  || — || September 28, 2006 || Mount Lemmon || Mount Lemmon Survey || — || align=right | 1.1 km || 
|-id=691 bgcolor=#E9E9E9
| 319691 ||  || — || October 15, 2006 || Kitt Peak || Spacewatch || — || align=right | 1.5 km || 
|-id=692 bgcolor=#fefefe
| 319692 ||  || — || October 15, 2006 || Kitt Peak || Spacewatch || fast? || align=right data-sort-value="0.88" | 880 m || 
|-id=693 bgcolor=#E9E9E9
| 319693 ||  || — || October 13, 2006 || Kitt Peak || Spacewatch || — || align=right | 1.8 km || 
|-id=694 bgcolor=#E9E9E9
| 319694 ||  || — || October 13, 2006 || Kitt Peak || Spacewatch || — || align=right | 2.1 km || 
|-id=695 bgcolor=#d6d6d6
| 319695 ||  || — || October 1, 2006 || Apache Point || A. C. Becker || — || align=right | 3.0 km || 
|-id=696 bgcolor=#E9E9E9
| 319696 ||  || — || October 3, 2006 || Apache Point || A. C. Becker || — || align=right | 2.6 km || 
|-id=697 bgcolor=#E9E9E9
| 319697 ||  || — || October 13, 2006 || Kitt Peak || Spacewatch || — || align=right | 1.7 km || 
|-id=698 bgcolor=#fefefe
| 319698 ||  || — || October 13, 2006 || Kitt Peak || Spacewatch || — || align=right data-sort-value="0.94" | 940 m || 
|-id=699 bgcolor=#E9E9E9
| 319699 ||  || — || October 16, 2006 || Catalina || CSS || — || align=right | 1.5 km || 
|-id=700 bgcolor=#E9E9E9
| 319700 ||  || — || October 16, 2006 || Kitt Peak || Spacewatch || — || align=right | 1.5 km || 
|}

319701–319800 

|-bgcolor=#fefefe
| 319701 ||  || — || October 16, 2006 || Catalina || CSS || — || align=right | 1.0 km || 
|-id=702 bgcolor=#E9E9E9
| 319702 ||  || — || October 16, 2006 || Mount Lemmon || Mount Lemmon Survey || ADE || align=right | 2.0 km || 
|-id=703 bgcolor=#E9E9E9
| 319703 ||  || — || March 6, 2003 || Anderson Mesa || LONEOS || — || align=right | 1.9 km || 
|-id=704 bgcolor=#E9E9E9
| 319704 ||  || — || October 16, 2006 || Kitt Peak || Spacewatch || — || align=right | 1.3 km || 
|-id=705 bgcolor=#fefefe
| 319705 ||  || — || October 16, 2006 || Kitt Peak || Spacewatch || — || align=right | 1.1 km || 
|-id=706 bgcolor=#E9E9E9
| 319706 ||  || — || October 16, 2006 || Kitt Peak || Spacewatch || — || align=right data-sort-value="0.92" | 920 m || 
|-id=707 bgcolor=#E9E9E9
| 319707 ||  || — || October 16, 2006 || Kitt Peak || Spacewatch || — || align=right | 1.1 km || 
|-id=708 bgcolor=#E9E9E9
| 319708 ||  || — || October 16, 2006 || Kitt Peak || Spacewatch || — || align=right | 1.1 km || 
|-id=709 bgcolor=#fefefe
| 319709 ||  || — || October 16, 2006 || Kitt Peak || Spacewatch || NYS || align=right data-sort-value="0.76" | 760 m || 
|-id=710 bgcolor=#E9E9E9
| 319710 ||  || — || October 16, 2006 || Kitt Peak || Spacewatch || — || align=right data-sort-value="0.92" | 920 m || 
|-id=711 bgcolor=#E9E9E9
| 319711 ||  || — || October 16, 2006 || Kitt Peak || Spacewatch || — || align=right | 1.7 km || 
|-id=712 bgcolor=#E9E9E9
| 319712 ||  || — || October 16, 2006 || Kitt Peak || Spacewatch || — || align=right | 1.3 km || 
|-id=713 bgcolor=#fefefe
| 319713 ||  || — || October 16, 2006 || Kitt Peak || Spacewatch || FLO || align=right data-sort-value="0.91" | 910 m || 
|-id=714 bgcolor=#E9E9E9
| 319714 ||  || — || October 17, 2006 || Kitt Peak || Spacewatch || RAF || align=right | 1.1 km || 
|-id=715 bgcolor=#fefefe
| 319715 ||  || — || October 17, 2006 || Kitt Peak || Spacewatch || — || align=right data-sort-value="0.85" | 850 m || 
|-id=716 bgcolor=#fefefe
| 319716 ||  || — || October 17, 2006 || Catalina || CSS || — || align=right data-sort-value="0.96" | 960 m || 
|-id=717 bgcolor=#fefefe
| 319717 ||  || — || October 18, 2006 || Kitt Peak || Spacewatch || V || align=right data-sort-value="0.90" | 900 m || 
|-id=718 bgcolor=#fefefe
| 319718 ||  || — || October 18, 2006 || Kitt Peak || Spacewatch || — || align=right | 1.0 km || 
|-id=719 bgcolor=#E9E9E9
| 319719 ||  || — || October 19, 2006 || Mount Lemmon || Mount Lemmon Survey || — || align=right | 1.2 km || 
|-id=720 bgcolor=#E9E9E9
| 319720 ||  || — || October 19, 2006 || Mount Lemmon || Mount Lemmon Survey || — || align=right | 1.5 km || 
|-id=721 bgcolor=#E9E9E9
| 319721 ||  || — || October 16, 2006 || Bergisch Gladbac || W. Bickel || — || align=right | 1.5 km || 
|-id=722 bgcolor=#E9E9E9
| 319722 ||  || — || October 17, 2006 || Mount Lemmon || Mount Lemmon Survey || — || align=right | 1.9 km || 
|-id=723 bgcolor=#E9E9E9
| 319723 ||  || — || October 17, 2006 || Mount Lemmon || Mount Lemmon Survey || — || align=right | 1.0 km || 
|-id=724 bgcolor=#E9E9E9
| 319724 ||  || — || October 17, 2006 || Mount Lemmon || Mount Lemmon Survey || — || align=right | 1.3 km || 
|-id=725 bgcolor=#E9E9E9
| 319725 ||  || — || October 17, 2006 || Mount Lemmon || Mount Lemmon Survey || — || align=right | 1.5 km || 
|-id=726 bgcolor=#E9E9E9
| 319726 ||  || — || October 17, 2006 || Mount Lemmon || Mount Lemmon Survey || — || align=right | 1.2 km || 
|-id=727 bgcolor=#E9E9E9
| 319727 ||  || — || October 18, 2006 || Kitt Peak || Spacewatch || — || align=right | 1.3 km || 
|-id=728 bgcolor=#E9E9E9
| 319728 ||  || — || October 18, 2006 || Kitt Peak || Spacewatch || — || align=right | 1.6 km || 
|-id=729 bgcolor=#E9E9E9
| 319729 ||  || — || October 18, 2006 || Kitt Peak || Spacewatch || — || align=right | 1.3 km || 
|-id=730 bgcolor=#E9E9E9
| 319730 ||  || — || October 18, 2006 || Kitt Peak || Spacewatch || — || align=right | 1.8 km || 
|-id=731 bgcolor=#E9E9E9
| 319731 ||  || — || October 19, 2006 || Kitt Peak || Spacewatch || — || align=right | 1.2 km || 
|-id=732 bgcolor=#E9E9E9
| 319732 ||  || — || October 2, 2006 || Kitt Peak || Spacewatch || — || align=right data-sort-value="0.94" | 940 m || 
|-id=733 bgcolor=#E9E9E9
| 319733 ||  || — || October 19, 2006 || Kitt Peak || Spacewatch || — || align=right | 1.1 km || 
|-id=734 bgcolor=#E9E9E9
| 319734 ||  || — || October 19, 2006 || Kitt Peak || Spacewatch || — || align=right data-sort-value="0.81" | 810 m || 
|-id=735 bgcolor=#d6d6d6
| 319735 ||  || — || October 19, 2006 || Kitt Peak || Spacewatch || — || align=right | 3.4 km || 
|-id=736 bgcolor=#E9E9E9
| 319736 ||  || — || October 19, 2006 || Kitt Peak || Spacewatch || — || align=right | 1.5 km || 
|-id=737 bgcolor=#E9E9E9
| 319737 ||  || — || October 19, 2006 || Mount Lemmon || Mount Lemmon Survey || — || align=right data-sort-value="0.97" | 970 m || 
|-id=738 bgcolor=#E9E9E9
| 319738 ||  || — || October 19, 2006 || Kitt Peak || Spacewatch || — || align=right | 2.0 km || 
|-id=739 bgcolor=#E9E9E9
| 319739 ||  || — || October 19, 2006 || Kitt Peak || Spacewatch || — || align=right | 1.3 km || 
|-id=740 bgcolor=#E9E9E9
| 319740 ||  || — || October 19, 2006 || Kitt Peak || Spacewatch || — || align=right | 1.1 km || 
|-id=741 bgcolor=#E9E9E9
| 319741 ||  || — || October 19, 2006 || Kitt Peak || Spacewatch || — || align=right | 1.1 km || 
|-id=742 bgcolor=#E9E9E9
| 319742 ||  || — || October 19, 2006 || Mount Lemmon || Mount Lemmon Survey || — || align=right | 1.3 km || 
|-id=743 bgcolor=#E9E9E9
| 319743 ||  || — || October 19, 2006 || Catalina || CSS || — || align=right | 1.5 km || 
|-id=744 bgcolor=#fefefe
| 319744 ||  || — || March 29, 2001 || Kitt Peak || Spacewatch || — || align=right data-sort-value="0.80" | 800 m || 
|-id=745 bgcolor=#fefefe
| 319745 ||  || — || October 19, 2006 || Palomar || NEAT || V || align=right data-sort-value="0.90" | 900 m || 
|-id=746 bgcolor=#E9E9E9
| 319746 ||  || — || October 19, 2006 || Mount Lemmon || Mount Lemmon Survey || — || align=right | 1.3 km || 
|-id=747 bgcolor=#E9E9E9
| 319747 ||  || — || October 20, 2006 || Kitt Peak || Spacewatch || — || align=right | 1.4 km || 
|-id=748 bgcolor=#E9E9E9
| 319748 ||  || — || October 21, 2006 || Kitt Peak || Spacewatch || — || align=right | 1.7 km || 
|-id=749 bgcolor=#E9E9E9
| 319749 ||  || — || October 21, 2006 || Mount Lemmon || Mount Lemmon Survey || — || align=right | 1.6 km || 
|-id=750 bgcolor=#E9E9E9
| 319750 ||  || — || October 21, 2006 || Kitt Peak || Spacewatch || — || align=right | 1.5 km || 
|-id=751 bgcolor=#E9E9E9
| 319751 ||  || — || October 19, 2006 || Mount Lemmon || Mount Lemmon Survey || — || align=right | 2.0 km || 
|-id=752 bgcolor=#E9E9E9
| 319752 ||  || — || October 16, 2006 || Catalina || CSS || — || align=right | 1.5 km || 
|-id=753 bgcolor=#fefefe
| 319753 ||  || — || October 16, 2006 || Catalina || CSS || — || align=right | 1.0 km || 
|-id=754 bgcolor=#E9E9E9
| 319754 ||  || — || October 16, 2006 || Catalina || CSS || ADE || align=right | 2.4 km || 
|-id=755 bgcolor=#E9E9E9
| 319755 ||  || — || October 16, 2006 || Catalina || CSS || EUN || align=right | 1.4 km || 
|-id=756 bgcolor=#E9E9E9
| 319756 ||  || — || October 19, 2006 || Catalina || CSS || JUN || align=right | 1.2 km || 
|-id=757 bgcolor=#E9E9E9
| 319757 ||  || — || October 19, 2006 || Palomar || NEAT || critical || align=right | 1.3 km || 
|-id=758 bgcolor=#E9E9E9
| 319758 ||  || — || October 19, 2006 || Catalina || CSS || — || align=right | 2.3 km || 
|-id=759 bgcolor=#E9E9E9
| 319759 ||  || — || October 19, 2006 || Catalina || CSS || — || align=right | 1.2 km || 
|-id=760 bgcolor=#E9E9E9
| 319760 ||  || — || October 20, 2006 || Kitt Peak || Spacewatch || — || align=right | 2.7 km || 
|-id=761 bgcolor=#E9E9E9
| 319761 ||  || — || October 22, 2006 || Palomar || NEAT || — || align=right | 2.4 km || 
|-id=762 bgcolor=#E9E9E9
| 319762 ||  || — || October 23, 2006 || Kitt Peak || Spacewatch || — || align=right data-sort-value="0.86" | 860 m || 
|-id=763 bgcolor=#fefefe
| 319763 ||  || — || October 23, 2006 || Kitt Peak || Spacewatch || — || align=right data-sort-value="0.78" | 780 m || 
|-id=764 bgcolor=#E9E9E9
| 319764 ||  || — || October 23, 2006 || Palomar || NEAT || — || align=right | 1.3 km || 
|-id=765 bgcolor=#E9E9E9
| 319765 ||  || — || October 23, 2006 || Kitt Peak || Spacewatch || — || align=right | 1.2 km || 
|-id=766 bgcolor=#E9E9E9
| 319766 ||  || — || October 24, 2006 || Palomar || NEAT || — || align=right | 1.7 km || 
|-id=767 bgcolor=#E9E9E9
| 319767 ||  || — || October 24, 2006 || Wildberg || R. Apitzsch || — || align=right | 1.1 km || 
|-id=768 bgcolor=#E9E9E9
| 319768 ||  || — || October 20, 2006 || Kitt Peak || Spacewatch || — || align=right | 1.3 km || 
|-id=769 bgcolor=#E9E9E9
| 319769 ||  || — || October 20, 2006 || Palomar || NEAT || — || align=right | 1.8 km || 
|-id=770 bgcolor=#E9E9E9
| 319770 ||  || — || October 20, 2006 || Palomar || NEAT || — || align=right | 1.2 km || 
|-id=771 bgcolor=#fefefe
| 319771 ||  || — || October 27, 2006 || Mount Lemmon || Mount Lemmon Survey || — || align=right | 1.1 km || 
|-id=772 bgcolor=#fefefe
| 319772 ||  || — || October 28, 2006 || Mount Lemmon || Mount Lemmon Survey || NYS || align=right data-sort-value="0.79" | 790 m || 
|-id=773 bgcolor=#fefefe
| 319773 ||  || — || October 27, 2006 || Kitt Peak || Spacewatch || NYS || align=right data-sort-value="0.68" | 680 m || 
|-id=774 bgcolor=#FA8072
| 319774 ||  || — || October 27, 2006 || Mount Lemmon || Mount Lemmon Survey || — || align=right data-sort-value="0.77" | 770 m || 
|-id=775 bgcolor=#E9E9E9
| 319775 ||  || — || October 27, 2006 || Catalina || CSS || — || align=right | 1.6 km || 
|-id=776 bgcolor=#E9E9E9
| 319776 ||  || — || October 27, 2006 || Mount Lemmon || Mount Lemmon Survey || — || align=right | 1.0 km || 
|-id=777 bgcolor=#E9E9E9
| 319777 ||  || — || October 27, 2006 || Kitt Peak || Spacewatch || RAF || align=right | 1.2 km || 
|-id=778 bgcolor=#fefefe
| 319778 ||  || — || October 28, 2006 || Kitt Peak || Spacewatch || — || align=right data-sort-value="0.92" | 920 m || 
|-id=779 bgcolor=#fefefe
| 319779 ||  || — || October 28, 2006 || Kitt Peak || Spacewatch || V || align=right data-sort-value="0.78" | 780 m || 
|-id=780 bgcolor=#E9E9E9
| 319780 ||  || — || October 28, 2006 || Kitt Peak || Spacewatch || — || align=right | 1.8 km || 
|-id=781 bgcolor=#E9E9E9
| 319781 ||  || — || October 28, 2006 || Kitt Peak || Spacewatch || — || align=right | 2.5 km || 
|-id=782 bgcolor=#E9E9E9
| 319782 ||  || — || October 28, 2006 || Kitt Peak || Spacewatch || — || align=right | 1.3 km || 
|-id=783 bgcolor=#E9E9E9
| 319783 ||  || — || October 27, 2006 || Kitt Peak || Spacewatch || — || align=right | 2.3 km || 
|-id=784 bgcolor=#fefefe
| 319784 ||  || — || October 19, 2006 || Kitt Peak || M. W. Buie || — || align=right data-sort-value="0.99" | 990 m || 
|-id=785 bgcolor=#E9E9E9
| 319785 ||  || — || October 17, 2006 || Catalina || CSS || — || align=right | 2.2 km || 
|-id=786 bgcolor=#E9E9E9
| 319786 ||  || — || October 21, 2006 || Apache Point || A. C. Becker || — || align=right | 1.6 km || 
|-id=787 bgcolor=#E9E9E9
| 319787 ||  || — || October 21, 2006 || Apache Point || A. C. Becker || — || align=right | 1.8 km || 
|-id=788 bgcolor=#d6d6d6
| 319788 ||  || — || October 22, 2006 || Apache Point || A. C. Becker || HYG || align=right | 3.7 km || 
|-id=789 bgcolor=#fefefe
| 319789 ||  || — || October 20, 2006 || Mount Lemmon || Mount Lemmon Survey || NYS || align=right data-sort-value="0.96" | 960 m || 
|-id=790 bgcolor=#fefefe
| 319790 ||  || — || October 20, 2006 || Kitt Peak || Spacewatch || NYS || align=right data-sort-value="0.84" | 840 m || 
|-id=791 bgcolor=#fefefe
| 319791 ||  || — || October 27, 2006 || Mount Lemmon || Mount Lemmon Survey || — || align=right | 1.0 km || 
|-id=792 bgcolor=#E9E9E9
| 319792 ||  || — || October 27, 2006 || Mount Lemmon || Mount Lemmon Survey || — || align=right data-sort-value="0.95" | 950 m || 
|-id=793 bgcolor=#E9E9E9
| 319793 ||  || — || October 23, 2006 || Catalina || CSS || — || align=right | 1.8 km || 
|-id=794 bgcolor=#fefefe
| 319794 ||  || — || November 9, 2006 || Kitt Peak || Spacewatch || NYS || align=right data-sort-value="0.86" | 860 m || 
|-id=795 bgcolor=#E9E9E9
| 319795 ||  || — || November 10, 2006 || Kitt Peak || Spacewatch || — || align=right data-sort-value="0.93" | 930 m || 
|-id=796 bgcolor=#fefefe
| 319796 ||  || — || November 10, 2006 || Kitt Peak || Spacewatch || V || align=right data-sort-value="0.93" | 930 m || 
|-id=797 bgcolor=#E9E9E9
| 319797 ||  || — || November 15, 2006 || Remanzacco || Remanzacco Obs. || — || align=right | 2.5 km || 
|-id=798 bgcolor=#E9E9E9
| 319798 ||  || — || November 15, 2006 || Wrightwood || J. W. Young || — || align=right data-sort-value="0.92" | 920 m || 
|-id=799 bgcolor=#E9E9E9
| 319799 ||  || — || November 9, 2006 || Kitt Peak || Spacewatch || — || align=right | 1.2 km || 
|-id=800 bgcolor=#E9E9E9
| 319800 ||  || — || November 10, 2006 || Kitt Peak || Spacewatch || — || align=right data-sort-value="0.91" | 910 m || 
|}

319801–319900 

|-bgcolor=#E9E9E9
| 319801 ||  || — || November 1, 2006 || Mount Lemmon || Mount Lemmon Survey || — || align=right | 2.0 km || 
|-id=802 bgcolor=#E9E9E9
| 319802 ||  || — || November 11, 2006 || Mount Lemmon || Mount Lemmon Survey || — || align=right | 1.8 km || 
|-id=803 bgcolor=#E9E9E9
| 319803 ||  || — || November 11, 2006 || Catalina || CSS || — || align=right | 1.7 km || 
|-id=804 bgcolor=#E9E9E9
| 319804 ||  || — || November 11, 2006 || Palomar || NEAT || — || align=right | 1.4 km || 
|-id=805 bgcolor=#E9E9E9
| 319805 ||  || — || November 10, 2006 || Kitt Peak || Spacewatch || — || align=right data-sort-value="0.90" | 900 m || 
|-id=806 bgcolor=#E9E9E9
| 319806 ||  || — || November 10, 2006 || Kitt Peak || Spacewatch || — || align=right | 1.9 km || 
|-id=807 bgcolor=#E9E9E9
| 319807 ||  || — || November 10, 2006 || Kitt Peak || Spacewatch || MIS || align=right | 1.8 km || 
|-id=808 bgcolor=#E9E9E9
| 319808 ||  || — || November 10, 2006 || Kitt Peak || Spacewatch || — || align=right | 2.0 km || 
|-id=809 bgcolor=#E9E9E9
| 319809 ||  || — || November 10, 2006 || Kitt Peak || Spacewatch || — || align=right | 2.8 km || 
|-id=810 bgcolor=#E9E9E9
| 319810 ||  || — || November 11, 2006 || Kitt Peak || Spacewatch || — || align=right | 3.2 km || 
|-id=811 bgcolor=#E9E9E9
| 319811 ||  || — || November 11, 2006 || Kitt Peak || Spacewatch || — || align=right | 1.0 km || 
|-id=812 bgcolor=#E9E9E9
| 319812 ||  || — || November 11, 2006 || Kitt Peak || Spacewatch || — || align=right | 1.4 km || 
|-id=813 bgcolor=#fefefe
| 319813 ||  || — || November 11, 2006 || Kitt Peak || Spacewatch || V || align=right data-sort-value="0.92" | 920 m || 
|-id=814 bgcolor=#E9E9E9
| 319814 ||  || — || November 11, 2006 || Kitt Peak || Spacewatch || — || align=right | 1.5 km || 
|-id=815 bgcolor=#E9E9E9
| 319815 ||  || — || November 11, 2006 || Catalina || CSS || — || align=right | 1.9 km || 
|-id=816 bgcolor=#E9E9E9
| 319816 ||  || — || November 12, 2006 || Mount Lemmon || Mount Lemmon Survey || — || align=right | 1.1 km || 
|-id=817 bgcolor=#E9E9E9
| 319817 ||  || — || September 27, 2006 || Mount Lemmon || Mount Lemmon Survey || — || align=right | 1.1 km || 
|-id=818 bgcolor=#E9E9E9
| 319818 ||  || — || November 13, 2006 || Kitt Peak || Spacewatch || — || align=right | 1.5 km || 
|-id=819 bgcolor=#fefefe
| 319819 ||  || — || November 15, 2006 || Catalina || CSS || V || align=right data-sort-value="0.99" | 990 m || 
|-id=820 bgcolor=#E9E9E9
| 319820 ||  || — || November 11, 2006 || Mount Lemmon || Mount Lemmon Survey || — || align=right | 1.6 km || 
|-id=821 bgcolor=#E9E9E9
| 319821 ||  || — || November 13, 2006 || Catalina || CSS || — || align=right | 1.7 km || 
|-id=822 bgcolor=#fefefe
| 319822 ||  || — || November 13, 2006 || Kitt Peak || Spacewatch || — || align=right | 1.4 km || 
|-id=823 bgcolor=#E9E9E9
| 319823 ||  || — || November 13, 2006 || Kitt Peak || Spacewatch || RAF || align=right | 1.6 km || 
|-id=824 bgcolor=#E9E9E9
| 319824 ||  || — || November 13, 2006 || Kitt Peak || Spacewatch || — || align=right | 1.4 km || 
|-id=825 bgcolor=#E9E9E9
| 319825 ||  || — || November 13, 2006 || Kitt Peak || Spacewatch || — || align=right | 1.1 km || 
|-id=826 bgcolor=#E9E9E9
| 319826 ||  || — || November 14, 2006 || Kitt Peak || Spacewatch || HEN || align=right data-sort-value="0.98" | 980 m || 
|-id=827 bgcolor=#E9E9E9
| 319827 ||  || — || November 14, 2006 || Kitt Peak || Spacewatch || — || align=right | 1.4 km || 
|-id=828 bgcolor=#fefefe
| 319828 ||  || — || November 14, 2006 || Kitt Peak || Spacewatch || — || align=right | 1.2 km || 
|-id=829 bgcolor=#E9E9E9
| 319829 ||  || — || November 14, 2006 || Kitt Peak || Spacewatch || — || align=right | 1.4 km || 
|-id=830 bgcolor=#E9E9E9
| 319830 ||  || — || November 14, 2006 || Kitt Peak || Spacewatch || — || align=right | 1.3 km || 
|-id=831 bgcolor=#d6d6d6
| 319831 ||  || — || November 15, 2006 || Kitt Peak || Spacewatch || — || align=right | 3.7 km || 
|-id=832 bgcolor=#E9E9E9
| 319832 ||  || — || November 15, 2006 || Kitt Peak || Spacewatch || — || align=right | 1.4 km || 
|-id=833 bgcolor=#E9E9E9
| 319833 ||  || — || November 15, 2006 || Socorro || LINEAR || — || align=right | 1.8 km || 
|-id=834 bgcolor=#E9E9E9
| 319834 ||  || — || November 15, 2006 || Kitt Peak || Spacewatch || — || align=right | 1.5 km || 
|-id=835 bgcolor=#E9E9E9
| 319835 ||  || — || November 9, 2006 || Palomar || NEAT || — || align=right | 1.3 km || 
|-id=836 bgcolor=#E9E9E9
| 319836 ||  || — || November 13, 2006 || Catalina || CSS || — || align=right | 3.1 km || 
|-id=837 bgcolor=#E9E9E9
| 319837 ||  || — || November 13, 2006 || Catalina || CSS || — || align=right | 3.3 km || 
|-id=838 bgcolor=#E9E9E9
| 319838 ||  || — || November 11, 2006 || Kitt Peak || Spacewatch || — || align=right | 1.6 km || 
|-id=839 bgcolor=#d6d6d6
| 319839 ||  || — || November 11, 2006 || Kitt Peak || Spacewatch || — || align=right | 2.7 km || 
|-id=840 bgcolor=#E9E9E9
| 319840 ||  || — || November 17, 2006 || Catalina || CSS || BAR || align=right | 1.7 km || 
|-id=841 bgcolor=#E9E9E9
| 319841 ||  || — || November 18, 2006 || 7300 Observatory || W. K. Y. Yeung || — || align=right | 1.3 km || 
|-id=842 bgcolor=#fefefe
| 319842 ||  || — || November 16, 2006 || Kitt Peak || Spacewatch || — || align=right data-sort-value="0.93" | 930 m || 
|-id=843 bgcolor=#E9E9E9
| 319843 ||  || — || November 16, 2006 || Kitt Peak || Spacewatch || — || align=right | 1.6 km || 
|-id=844 bgcolor=#E9E9E9
| 319844 ||  || — || November 16, 2006 || Mount Lemmon || Mount Lemmon Survey || — || align=right | 1.4 km || 
|-id=845 bgcolor=#E9E9E9
| 319845 ||  || — || November 17, 2006 || Kitt Peak || Spacewatch || MAR || align=right | 1.4 km || 
|-id=846 bgcolor=#E9E9E9
| 319846 ||  || — || November 17, 2006 || Mount Lemmon || Mount Lemmon Survey || — || align=right | 1.0 km || 
|-id=847 bgcolor=#fefefe
| 319847 ||  || — || November 17, 2006 || Mount Lemmon || Mount Lemmon Survey || — || align=right | 1.0 km || 
|-id=848 bgcolor=#E9E9E9
| 319848 ||  || — || November 17, 2006 || Mount Lemmon || Mount Lemmon Survey || — || align=right | 1.2 km || 
|-id=849 bgcolor=#d6d6d6
| 319849 ||  || — || November 17, 2006 || Kitt Peak || Spacewatch || — || align=right | 4.3 km || 
|-id=850 bgcolor=#E9E9E9
| 319850 ||  || — || November 17, 2006 || Mount Lemmon || Mount Lemmon Survey || MAR || align=right | 1.5 km || 
|-id=851 bgcolor=#E9E9E9
| 319851 ||  || — || November 16, 2006 || Kitt Peak || Spacewatch || — || align=right | 1.6 km || 
|-id=852 bgcolor=#E9E9E9
| 319852 ||  || — || November 16, 2006 || Kitt Peak || Spacewatch || — || align=right | 1.7 km || 
|-id=853 bgcolor=#E9E9E9
| 319853 ||  || — || November 16, 2006 || Kitt Peak || Spacewatch || — || align=right | 1.5 km || 
|-id=854 bgcolor=#E9E9E9
| 319854 ||  || — || November 16, 2006 || Kitt Peak || Spacewatch || — || align=right | 2.2 km || 
|-id=855 bgcolor=#fefefe
| 319855 ||  || — || October 31, 2006 || Mount Lemmon || Mount Lemmon Survey || MAS || align=right data-sort-value="0.76" | 760 m || 
|-id=856 bgcolor=#E9E9E9
| 319856 ||  || — || November 16, 2006 || Mount Lemmon || Mount Lemmon Survey || — || align=right | 1.4 km || 
|-id=857 bgcolor=#E9E9E9
| 319857 ||  || — || November 16, 2006 || Kitt Peak || Spacewatch || — || align=right | 1.4 km || 
|-id=858 bgcolor=#fefefe
| 319858 ||  || — || November 16, 2006 || Kitt Peak || Spacewatch || — || align=right | 1.1 km || 
|-id=859 bgcolor=#fefefe
| 319859 ||  || — || November 16, 2006 || Mount Lemmon || Mount Lemmon Survey || — || align=right data-sort-value="0.74" | 740 m || 
|-id=860 bgcolor=#E9E9E9
| 319860 ||  || — || November 16, 2006 || Catalina || CSS || — || align=right | 2.6 km || 
|-id=861 bgcolor=#E9E9E9
| 319861 ||  || — || November 16, 2006 || Socorro || LINEAR || — || align=right | 2.0 km || 
|-id=862 bgcolor=#E9E9E9
| 319862 ||  || — || November 16, 2006 || Kitt Peak || Spacewatch || — || align=right | 2.5 km || 
|-id=863 bgcolor=#fefefe
| 319863 ||  || — || November 16, 2006 || Kitt Peak || Spacewatch || — || align=right | 1.0 km || 
|-id=864 bgcolor=#E9E9E9
| 319864 ||  || — || November 17, 2006 || Catalina || CSS || — || align=right | 2.7 km || 
|-id=865 bgcolor=#E9E9E9
| 319865 ||  || — || November 17, 2006 || Mount Lemmon || Mount Lemmon Survey || — || align=right | 1.7 km || 
|-id=866 bgcolor=#E9E9E9
| 319866 ||  || — || November 18, 2006 || Kitt Peak || Spacewatch || — || align=right | 1.6 km || 
|-id=867 bgcolor=#E9E9E9
| 319867 ||  || — || November 18, 2006 || Kitt Peak || Spacewatch || — || align=right | 1.1 km || 
|-id=868 bgcolor=#fefefe
| 319868 ||  || — || November 18, 2006 || Kitt Peak || Spacewatch || NYS || align=right data-sort-value="0.85" | 850 m || 
|-id=869 bgcolor=#fefefe
| 319869 ||  || — || February 3, 2000 || Kitt Peak || Spacewatch || — || align=right data-sort-value="0.84" | 840 m || 
|-id=870 bgcolor=#fefefe
| 319870 ||  || — || November 18, 2006 || Kitt Peak || Spacewatch || — || align=right | 1.0 km || 
|-id=871 bgcolor=#E9E9E9
| 319871 ||  || — || November 18, 2006 || Kitt Peak || Spacewatch || — || align=right | 1.2 km || 
|-id=872 bgcolor=#fefefe
| 319872 ||  || — || November 19, 2006 || Kitt Peak || Spacewatch || NYS || align=right data-sort-value="0.83" | 830 m || 
|-id=873 bgcolor=#E9E9E9
| 319873 ||  || — || November 19, 2006 || Socorro || LINEAR || — || align=right | 1.2 km || 
|-id=874 bgcolor=#fefefe
| 319874 ||  || — || November 19, 2006 || Catalina || CSS || — || align=right data-sort-value="0.95" | 950 m || 
|-id=875 bgcolor=#E9E9E9
| 319875 ||  || — || November 19, 2006 || Kitt Peak || Spacewatch || — || align=right | 1.2 km || 
|-id=876 bgcolor=#d6d6d6
| 319876 ||  || — || November 19, 2006 || Catalina || CSS || EOS || align=right | 2.5 km || 
|-id=877 bgcolor=#E9E9E9
| 319877 ||  || — || November 19, 2006 || Kitt Peak || Spacewatch || — || align=right | 2.1 km || 
|-id=878 bgcolor=#E9E9E9
| 319878 ||  || — || November 19, 2006 || Kitt Peak || Spacewatch || — || align=right data-sort-value="0.78" | 780 m || 
|-id=879 bgcolor=#E9E9E9
| 319879 ||  || — || November 19, 2006 || Catalina || CSS || — || align=right | 2.1 km || 
|-id=880 bgcolor=#E9E9E9
| 319880 ||  || — || November 19, 2006 || Kitt Peak || Spacewatch || — || align=right | 1.6 km || 
|-id=881 bgcolor=#E9E9E9
| 319881 ||  || — || November 20, 2006 || Catalina || CSS || — || align=right | 2.4 km || 
|-id=882 bgcolor=#fefefe
| 319882 ||  || — || November 21, 2006 || Mount Lemmon || Mount Lemmon Survey || — || align=right data-sort-value="0.71" | 710 m || 
|-id=883 bgcolor=#E9E9E9
| 319883 ||  || — || November 22, 2006 || Kitt Peak || Spacewatch || — || align=right | 1.1 km || 
|-id=884 bgcolor=#E9E9E9
| 319884 ||  || — || November 22, 2006 || Catalina || CSS || — || align=right | 2.0 km || 
|-id=885 bgcolor=#fefefe
| 319885 ||  || — || November 26, 2006 || 7300 || W. K. Y. Yeung || — || align=right data-sort-value="0.59" | 590 m || 
|-id=886 bgcolor=#E9E9E9
| 319886 ||  || — || November 18, 2006 || Kitt Peak || Spacewatch || HEN || align=right data-sort-value="0.92" | 920 m || 
|-id=887 bgcolor=#d6d6d6
| 319887 ||  || — || November 20, 2006 || Kitt Peak || Spacewatch || KOR || align=right | 1.7 km || 
|-id=888 bgcolor=#E9E9E9
| 319888 ||  || — || October 20, 2006 || Mount Lemmon || Mount Lemmon Survey || — || align=right | 1.3 km || 
|-id=889 bgcolor=#E9E9E9
| 319889 ||  || — || November 22, 2006 || Catalina || CSS || ADE || align=right | 2.5 km || 
|-id=890 bgcolor=#E9E9E9
| 319890 ||  || — || November 22, 2006 || Catalina || CSS || — || align=right | 1.5 km || 
|-id=891 bgcolor=#E9E9E9
| 319891 ||  || — || November 23, 2006 || Kitt Peak || Spacewatch || — || align=right | 1.6 km || 
|-id=892 bgcolor=#E9E9E9
| 319892 ||  || — || November 23, 2006 || Kitt Peak || Spacewatch || — || align=right | 1.4 km || 
|-id=893 bgcolor=#d6d6d6
| 319893 ||  || — || November 23, 2006 || Kitt Peak || Spacewatch || KOR || align=right | 1.4 km || 
|-id=894 bgcolor=#E9E9E9
| 319894 ||  || — || November 23, 2006 || Catalina || CSS || — || align=right | 2.3 km || 
|-id=895 bgcolor=#d6d6d6
| 319895 ||  || — || March 27, 2004 || Kitt Peak || Spacewatch || — || align=right | 3.8 km || 
|-id=896 bgcolor=#E9E9E9
| 319896 ||  || — || November 24, 2006 || Mount Lemmon || Mount Lemmon Survey || WIT || align=right | 1.2 km || 
|-id=897 bgcolor=#E9E9E9
| 319897 ||  || — || November 27, 2006 || Kitt Peak || Spacewatch || HEN || align=right | 1.3 km || 
|-id=898 bgcolor=#E9E9E9
| 319898 ||  || — || November 27, 2006 || Kitt Peak || Spacewatch || — || align=right | 1.1 km || 
|-id=899 bgcolor=#E9E9E9
| 319899 ||  || — || November 22, 2006 || Mount Lemmon || Mount Lemmon Survey || — || align=right | 1.0 km || 
|-id=900 bgcolor=#E9E9E9
| 319900 ||  || — || November 23, 2006 || Mount Lemmon || Mount Lemmon Survey || EUN || align=right | 1.6 km || 
|}

319901–320000 

|-bgcolor=#E9E9E9
| 319901 ||  || — || November 27, 2006 || Mount Lemmon || Mount Lemmon Survey || NEM || align=right | 2.5 km || 
|-id=902 bgcolor=#E9E9E9
| 319902 ||  || — || November 21, 2006 || Mount Lemmon || Mount Lemmon Survey || — || align=right | 1.9 km || 
|-id=903 bgcolor=#E9E9E9
| 319903 ||  || — || November 20, 2006 || Kitt Peak || Spacewatch || WIT || align=right | 1.3 km || 
|-id=904 bgcolor=#E9E9E9
| 319904 ||  || — || December 14, 2006 || Kitami || K. Endate || IAN || align=right | 1.5 km || 
|-id=905 bgcolor=#E9E9E9
| 319905 ||  || — || December 9, 2006 || Palomar || NEAT || — || align=right | 2.3 km || 
|-id=906 bgcolor=#E9E9E9
| 319906 ||  || — || December 9, 2006 || Palomar || NEAT || — || align=right | 2.3 km || 
|-id=907 bgcolor=#E9E9E9
| 319907 ||  || — || December 10, 2006 || 7300 || W. K. Y. Yeung || — || align=right | 1.8 km || 
|-id=908 bgcolor=#E9E9E9
| 319908 ||  || — || December 12, 2006 || Kitt Peak || Spacewatch || — || align=right | 1.7 km || 
|-id=909 bgcolor=#E9E9E9
| 319909 ||  || — || December 15, 2006 || Bisei SG Center || BATTeRS || — || align=right | 3.3 km || 
|-id=910 bgcolor=#E9E9E9
| 319910 ||  || — || December 15, 2006 || Bergisch Gladbac || W. Bickel || — || align=right | 2.2 km || 
|-id=911 bgcolor=#E9E9E9
| 319911 ||  || — || December 11, 2006 || Kitt Peak || Spacewatch || — || align=right | 2.6 km || 
|-id=912 bgcolor=#d6d6d6
| 319912 ||  || — || December 11, 2006 || Kitt Peak || Spacewatch || — || align=right | 2.1 km || 
|-id=913 bgcolor=#E9E9E9
| 319913 ||  || — || October 23, 2006 || Mount Lemmon || Mount Lemmon Survey || — || align=right | 1.8 km || 
|-id=914 bgcolor=#E9E9E9
| 319914 ||  || — || December 13, 2006 || Socorro || LINEAR || — || align=right | 2.4 km || 
|-id=915 bgcolor=#E9E9E9
| 319915 ||  || — || December 13, 2006 || Mount Lemmon || Mount Lemmon Survey || HEN || align=right | 1.2 km || 
|-id=916 bgcolor=#E9E9E9
| 319916 ||  || — || December 14, 2006 || Kitt Peak || Spacewatch || — || align=right | 1.9 km || 
|-id=917 bgcolor=#E9E9E9
| 319917 ||  || — || December 12, 2006 || Palomar || NEAT || — || align=right | 2.1 km || 
|-id=918 bgcolor=#d6d6d6
| 319918 ||  || — || December 13, 2006 || Kitt Peak || Spacewatch || — || align=right | 3.6 km || 
|-id=919 bgcolor=#E9E9E9
| 319919 ||  || — || December 15, 2006 || Kitt Peak || Spacewatch || — || align=right | 2.1 km || 
|-id=920 bgcolor=#E9E9E9
| 319920 ||  || — || December 1, 2006 || Kitt Peak || Spacewatch || NEM || align=right | 2.3 km || 
|-id=921 bgcolor=#E9E9E9
| 319921 ||  || — || September 23, 2005 || Kitt Peak || Spacewatch || — || align=right | 2.6 km || 
|-id=922 bgcolor=#E9E9E9
| 319922 ||  || — || December 18, 2006 || Nyukasa || Mount Nyukasa Stn. || GEF || align=right | 1.6 km || 
|-id=923 bgcolor=#fefefe
| 319923 ||  || — || December 21, 2006 || Mount Lemmon || Mount Lemmon Survey || — || align=right | 1.1 km || 
|-id=924 bgcolor=#E9E9E9
| 319924 ||  || — || December 21, 2006 || Mount Lemmon || Mount Lemmon Survey || — || align=right | 3.6 km || 
|-id=925 bgcolor=#E9E9E9
| 319925 ||  || — || December 27, 2006 || Piszkéstető || K. Sárneczky || — || align=right | 2.7 km || 
|-id=926 bgcolor=#E9E9E9
| 319926 ||  || — || December 21, 2006 || Kitt Peak || Spacewatch || — || align=right | 1.6 km || 
|-id=927 bgcolor=#E9E9E9
| 319927 ||  || — || August 31, 2005 || Kitt Peak || Spacewatch || PAD || align=right | 1.5 km || 
|-id=928 bgcolor=#E9E9E9
| 319928 ||  || — || December 21, 2006 || Kitt Peak || Spacewatch || ADE || align=right | 2.5 km || 
|-id=929 bgcolor=#E9E9E9
| 319929 ||  || — || December 21, 2006 || Kitt Peak || Spacewatch || — || align=right | 1.9 km || 
|-id=930 bgcolor=#E9E9E9
| 319930 ||  || — || December 21, 2006 || Kitt Peak || Spacewatch || — || align=right | 2.3 km || 
|-id=931 bgcolor=#E9E9E9
| 319931 ||  || — || December 21, 2006 || Kitt Peak || Spacewatch || — || align=right | 1.8 km || 
|-id=932 bgcolor=#E9E9E9
| 319932 ||  || — || December 22, 2006 || Socorro || LINEAR || — || align=right | 2.4 km || 
|-id=933 bgcolor=#E9E9E9
| 319933 ||  || — || December 23, 2006 || Catalina || CSS || — || align=right | 1.3 km || 
|-id=934 bgcolor=#E9E9E9
| 319934 ||  || — || December 21, 2006 || Mount Lemmon || Mount Lemmon Survey || HEN || align=right | 1.0 km || 
|-id=935 bgcolor=#fefefe
| 319935 ||  || — || December 24, 2006 || Kitt Peak || Spacewatch || — || align=right | 1.1 km || 
|-id=936 bgcolor=#E9E9E9
| 319936 ||  || — || December 21, 2006 || Kitt Peak || M. W. Buie || PAD || align=right | 1.8 km || 
|-id=937 bgcolor=#d6d6d6
| 319937 ||  || — || December 20, 2006 || Mount Lemmon || Mount Lemmon Survey || EOS || align=right | 2.0 km || 
|-id=938 bgcolor=#d6d6d6
| 319938 ||  || — || December 21, 2006 || Catalina || CSS || — || align=right | 4.4 km || 
|-id=939 bgcolor=#fefefe
| 319939 ||  || — || January 8, 2007 || Mount Lemmon || Mount Lemmon Survey || — || align=right | 1.4 km || 
|-id=940 bgcolor=#E9E9E9
| 319940 ||  || — || January 10, 2007 || Mount Lemmon || Mount Lemmon Survey || — || align=right | 2.6 km || 
|-id=941 bgcolor=#E9E9E9
| 319941 ||  || — || January 16, 2007 || Catalina || CSS || — || align=right | 3.7 km || 
|-id=942 bgcolor=#E9E9E9
| 319942 ||  || — || January 17, 2007 || Palomar || NEAT || AEO || align=right | 1.4 km || 
|-id=943 bgcolor=#E9E9E9
| 319943 ||  || — || January 17, 2007 || Kitt Peak || Spacewatch || — || align=right | 2.2 km || 
|-id=944 bgcolor=#E9E9E9
| 319944 ||  || — || January 17, 2007 || Palomar || NEAT || — || align=right | 2.6 km || 
|-id=945 bgcolor=#d6d6d6
| 319945 ||  || — || January 17, 2007 || Kitt Peak || Spacewatch || BRA || align=right | 1.6 km || 
|-id=946 bgcolor=#E9E9E9
| 319946 ||  || — || January 23, 2007 || Socorro || LINEAR || DOR || align=right | 3.1 km || 
|-id=947 bgcolor=#E9E9E9
| 319947 ||  || — || August 26, 2005 || Palomar || NEAT || — || align=right | 2.5 km || 
|-id=948 bgcolor=#d6d6d6
| 319948 ||  || — || January 24, 2007 || Mount Lemmon || Mount Lemmon Survey || CHA || align=right | 2.1 km || 
|-id=949 bgcolor=#E9E9E9
| 319949 ||  || — || January 24, 2007 || Mount Lemmon || Mount Lemmon Survey || GEF || align=right | 1.3 km || 
|-id=950 bgcolor=#fefefe
| 319950 ||  || — || January 24, 2007 || Mount Lemmon || Mount Lemmon Survey || — || align=right data-sort-value="0.64" | 640 m || 
|-id=951 bgcolor=#E9E9E9
| 319951 ||  || — || January 24, 2007 || Mount Lemmon || Mount Lemmon Survey || — || align=right | 1.8 km || 
|-id=952 bgcolor=#d6d6d6
| 319952 ||  || — || November 2, 2005 || Mount Lemmon || Mount Lemmon Survey || HYG || align=right | 3.4 km || 
|-id=953 bgcolor=#fefefe
| 319953 ||  || — || January 24, 2007 || Mount Lemmon || Mount Lemmon Survey || — || align=right data-sort-value="0.68" | 680 m || 
|-id=954 bgcolor=#E9E9E9
| 319954 ||  || — || January 24, 2007 || Mount Lemmon || Mount Lemmon Survey || NEM || align=right | 2.3 km || 
|-id=955 bgcolor=#E9E9E9
| 319955 ||  || — || January 26, 2007 || Kitt Peak || Spacewatch || — || align=right | 3.0 km || 
|-id=956 bgcolor=#E9E9E9
| 319956 ||  || — || January 24, 2007 || Catalina || CSS || — || align=right | 3.1 km || 
|-id=957 bgcolor=#E9E9E9
| 319957 ||  || — || January 27, 2007 || Mount Lemmon || Mount Lemmon Survey || — || align=right | 2.2 km || 
|-id=958 bgcolor=#d6d6d6
| 319958 ||  || — || January 27, 2007 || Mount Lemmon || Mount Lemmon Survey || — || align=right | 2.2 km || 
|-id=959 bgcolor=#d6d6d6
| 319959 ||  || — || January 27, 2007 || Mount Lemmon || Mount Lemmon Survey || — || align=right | 3.6 km || 
|-id=960 bgcolor=#d6d6d6
| 319960 ||  || — || January 27, 2007 || Mount Lemmon || Mount Lemmon Survey || — || align=right | 3.0 km || 
|-id=961 bgcolor=#d6d6d6
| 319961 ||  || — || January 27, 2007 || Kitt Peak || Spacewatch || — || align=right | 3.7 km || 
|-id=962 bgcolor=#E9E9E9
| 319962 ||  || — || January 17, 2007 || Kitt Peak || Spacewatch || — || align=right | 1.8 km || 
|-id=963 bgcolor=#E9E9E9
| 319963 ||  || — || January 8, 2007 || Mount Lemmon || Mount Lemmon Survey || — || align=right | 2.1 km || 
|-id=964 bgcolor=#E9E9E9
| 319964 ||  || — || January 24, 2007 || Catalina || CSS || — || align=right | 2.5 km || 
|-id=965 bgcolor=#d6d6d6
| 319965 ||  || — || October 12, 2005 || Kitt Peak || Spacewatch || KOR || align=right | 1.4 km || 
|-id=966 bgcolor=#E9E9E9
| 319966 ||  || — || January 16, 2007 || Catalina || CSS || — || align=right | 3.0 km || 
|-id=967 bgcolor=#E9E9E9
| 319967 ||  || — || January 24, 2007 || Mount Lemmon || Mount Lemmon Survey || — || align=right | 2.1 km || 
|-id=968 bgcolor=#d6d6d6
| 319968 ||  || — || January 17, 2007 || Catalina || CSS || — || align=right | 3.9 km || 
|-id=969 bgcolor=#E9E9E9
| 319969 ||  || — || February 6, 2007 || Kitt Peak || Spacewatch || AGN || align=right | 1.0 km || 
|-id=970 bgcolor=#E9E9E9
| 319970 ||  || — || February 6, 2007 || Kitt Peak || Spacewatch || HOF || align=right | 3.5 km || 
|-id=971 bgcolor=#E9E9E9
| 319971 ||  || — || December 24, 2006 || Kitt Peak || Spacewatch || AGN || align=right | 1.2 km || 
|-id=972 bgcolor=#E9E9E9
| 319972 ||  || — || February 6, 2007 || Kitt Peak || Spacewatch || — || align=right | 3.0 km || 
|-id=973 bgcolor=#E9E9E9
| 319973 ||  || — || February 6, 2007 || Mount Lemmon || Mount Lemmon Survey || — || align=right | 1.2 km || 
|-id=974 bgcolor=#fefefe
| 319974 ||  || — || February 8, 2007 || Kitt Peak || Spacewatch || — || align=right data-sort-value="0.65" | 650 m || 
|-id=975 bgcolor=#d6d6d6
| 319975 ||  || — || February 8, 2007 || Mount Lemmon || Mount Lemmon Survey || KAR || align=right | 1.3 km || 
|-id=976 bgcolor=#E9E9E9
| 319976 ||  || — || February 6, 2007 || Kitt Peak || Spacewatch || — || align=right | 3.0 km || 
|-id=977 bgcolor=#E9E9E9
| 319977 ||  || — || February 6, 2007 || Mount Lemmon || Mount Lemmon Survey || — || align=right | 2.1 km || 
|-id=978 bgcolor=#fefefe
| 319978 ||  || — || February 6, 2007 || Mount Lemmon || Mount Lemmon Survey || — || align=right data-sort-value="0.75" | 750 m || 
|-id=979 bgcolor=#E9E9E9
| 319979 ||  || — || February 6, 2007 || Mount Lemmon || Mount Lemmon Survey || — || align=right | 2.3 km || 
|-id=980 bgcolor=#E9E9E9
| 319980 ||  || — || February 6, 2007 || Mount Lemmon || Mount Lemmon Survey || — || align=right | 1.8 km || 
|-id=981 bgcolor=#d6d6d6
| 319981 ||  || — || February 6, 2007 || Mount Lemmon || Mount Lemmon Survey || CHA || align=right | 2.0 km || 
|-id=982 bgcolor=#d6d6d6
| 319982 ||  || — || February 8, 2007 || Palomar || NEAT || — || align=right | 3.7 km || 
|-id=983 bgcolor=#d6d6d6
| 319983 ||  || — || February 6, 2007 || Kitt Peak || Spacewatch || — || align=right | 4.7 km || 
|-id=984 bgcolor=#E9E9E9
| 319984 ||  || — || February 10, 2007 || Catalina || CSS || — || align=right | 1.6 km || 
|-id=985 bgcolor=#fefefe
| 319985 ||  || — || February 10, 2007 || Catalina || CSS || H || align=right data-sort-value="0.59" | 590 m || 
|-id=986 bgcolor=#d6d6d6
| 319986 ||  || — || February 15, 2007 || Catalina || CSS || 627 || align=right | 3.2 km || 
|-id=987 bgcolor=#d6d6d6
| 319987 ||  || — || February 9, 2007 || Kitt Peak || Spacewatch || — || align=right | 3.1 km || 
|-id=988 bgcolor=#FFC2E0
| 319988 ||  || — || February 17, 2007 || Catalina || CSS || APO || align=right data-sort-value="0.47" | 470 m || 
|-id=989 bgcolor=#d6d6d6
| 319989 ||  || — || October 22, 2006 || Mount Lemmon || Mount Lemmon Survey || URS || align=right | 4.3 km || 
|-id=990 bgcolor=#d6d6d6
| 319990 ||  || — || February 16, 2007 || Catalina || CSS || — || align=right | 3.4 km || 
|-id=991 bgcolor=#fefefe
| 319991 ||  || — || February 17, 2007 || Kitt Peak || Spacewatch || H || align=right data-sort-value="0.75" | 750 m || 
|-id=992 bgcolor=#d6d6d6
| 319992 ||  || — || February 17, 2007 || Kitt Peak || Spacewatch || — || align=right | 3.0 km || 
|-id=993 bgcolor=#E9E9E9
| 319993 ||  || — || February 17, 2007 || Kitt Peak || Spacewatch || — || align=right | 2.4 km || 
|-id=994 bgcolor=#d6d6d6
| 319994 ||  || — || February 17, 2007 || Kitt Peak || Spacewatch || K-2 || align=right | 1.6 km || 
|-id=995 bgcolor=#d6d6d6
| 319995 ||  || — || February 17, 2007 || Kitt Peak || Spacewatch || TEL || align=right | 1.7 km || 
|-id=996 bgcolor=#d6d6d6
| 319996 ||  || — || February 17, 2007 || Kitt Peak || Spacewatch || — || align=right | 2.6 km || 
|-id=997 bgcolor=#d6d6d6
| 319997 ||  || — || February 17, 2007 || Kitt Peak || Spacewatch || — || align=right | 3.6 km || 
|-id=998 bgcolor=#d6d6d6
| 319998 ||  || — || February 17, 2007 || Kitt Peak || Spacewatch || KOR || align=right | 1.8 km || 
|-id=999 bgcolor=#E9E9E9
| 319999 ||  || — || February 17, 2007 || Kitt Peak || Spacewatch || — || align=right | 1.4 km || 
|-id=000 bgcolor=#E9E9E9
| 320000 ||  || — || February 17, 2007 || Kitt Peak || Spacewatch || HOF || align=right | 3.2 km || 
|}

References

External links 
 Discovery Circumstances: Numbered Minor Planets (315001)–(320000) (IAU Minor Planet Center)

0319